This list of accidents and incidents on airliners by location summarizes airline accidents by state location, airline company with flight number, date, and cause. It is also available grouped
 by year as List of accidents and incidents involving commercial aircraft;
 by airline;
 by category.

If the aircraft crashed on land, it will be listed under a continent and a country. If the aircraft crashed on a body of water, it will be listed under that body of water (unless that body of water is part of the area of a country). Accidents and incidents written in bold were the deadliest in that country.

Africa



Algeria 
 On Air Algérie Flight 6289, at 5 seconds after takeoff, the left engine of the Boeing 737-200 exploded. The subsequent loss of control led to the deadliest aviation disaster in Algeria until 2018.
 Air France Flight 8969 was hijacked on the ground at Algiers and flown to France on 24 December 1994.
 Air France Flight 406 exploded and shattered into pieces when a bomb was smuggled inside its cargo on 10 May 1961, killing everyone on board.
TWA Flight 847, a Boeing 727-231, was hijacked shortly after takeoff on June 14, 1985. One person was killed.

Angola 
 N844AA was a Boeing 727 leased to TAAG Angola Airlines that was stolen from Quatro de Fevereiro Airport in Luanda on 25 May 2003. The aircraft disappeared after takeoff, and a mechanic confirmed to be on board has not been heard from since.
 A Trans Service Airlift Lockheed L-188 crashed on 18 December 1995 shortly after takeoff from Jamba Airport, killing 141 passengers and crew. The aircraft had been filled with 40 people beyond specifications. One crewmember and two passengers survived.
 TAAG Angola Airlines Flight 462 had is left wing strike the ground on 8 November 1983 after an apparent mechanical failure, and it crashed and exploded, killing all 130 people aboard.

Benin 
 UTA Flight 141 Overloading caused the plane to take off too late and struck an airport structure. The Boeing 727 slid and broke, plunged into the Atlantic in Benin's deadliest aviation disaster.

Botswana 
 1999 Air Botswana incident: On 11 October 1999, Chris Patswe, a former Air Botswana pilot, hijacked an aircraft and crashed it into another plane. He was the only person who died.

Cameroon 
 Caledonian Airways Flight 153 crashed into a swamp shortly after takeoff from Douala International Airport on 4 March 1962, killing all 111 aboard. The cause was never determined.
 Cameroon Airlines Flight 786: The Boeing 737-2H7C was taxiing for takeoff from Douala International Airport when engine number 2 suffered a turbine engine failure, which resulted in a fire. All 116 passengers and crews were able to evacuate from the burning aircraft, but two passengers died due to fire outside of the aircraft.
 Cameroon Airlines Flight 3701: Upon approach to Douala International Airport, the Boeing 737-200 nose-dived and crashed into a swamp, killing 71 people and injuring five. Engine thrust asymmetry and subsequent loss of control are suspected as the cause of the incident.
 Kenya Airways Flight 507: The night of 5 May 2007, shortly after takeoff from Douala International Airport, a Boeing 737-800 suddenly banked heavily to the right, nose-dived, and crashed into a swamp, killing all 114 aboard. The incident was caused by pilot error. The investigation identified a lack of crew coordination, spatial disorientation, and confusion in the use of the autopilot as contributing factors to Cameroon's deadliest plane crash.

Chad 
 Air West Flight 612 was hijacked shortly after takeoff from Khartoum, Sudan, and flown to N'Djamena, Chad, on 24 January 2007. No casualties occurred, and the hijacker gave himself up upon reaching Chad.

Comoros 
 Ethiopian Airlines Flight 961 was hijacked on 23 November 1996 en route from Addis Ababa to Nairobi by three Ethiopians seeking political asylum. The plane crash-landed in the Indian Ocean near Comoros after running out of fuel, killing 125 of the 175 passengers and crew on board.
 Yemenia Flight 626: The Airbus A310 was on approach to Moroni when it stalled. The flight crew did not take the appropriate action to recover it and the plane crashed into the Indian Ocean off the northern coast of Comoros on 30 June 2009. Of 153 aboard, 152 died; a 12-year-old passenger was found alive.

Democratic Republic of the Congo 
 Hewa Bora Airways Flight 122 crashed into a residential and market area of Goma on 15 April 2008 after its engines failed during takeoff. Three passengers and 37 people on the ground died; 83 passengers and eight crew survived. Additionally, 111 injuries were reported, 40 of whom were passengers.
 An Antonov An-26 operated by Africa One crashed and burned shortly after takeoff from Kinshasa on 4 October 2007. Deaths numbered 51, including 30 on the ground. One, possibly two, passengers survived. The cause of the crash is under investigation.
 An Antonov An-32B operated by the Great Lakes Business Company, overloaded with 9 tons of cassiterite and other minerals, and carrying 12 passengers and a crew of three developed engine failure about 10 minutes after takeoff from Kongolo Airport in Kongolo on 26 August 2007. It attempted to return to the airport, but struck trees, crashed short of the runway, and burned, killing 14 of the 15 people on board.
 An L-410 aircraft operated by Free Airlines crashed in a swamp shortly after takeoff from Kamina Airport on 21 June 2007. The plane was overloaded, carrying 21 passengers and crew rather than the 17 maximum specified. One person died, and four others were badly injured.
 An Antonov An-26B operated by Air Kasai in the Democratic Republic of the Congo on a flight from Boende to Kinshasa on 9 September 2005 crashed 50 km (31 miles) north of Brazzaville in the neighboring Republic of the Congo, killing all 13 people on board.
 An Antonov An-26B operated as a Kavatshi Airlines flight under an airworthiness certificate that had expired in September 2004, struck a tree, crashed, and burned while landing in fog at Matari Airport in Isiro, the Democratic Republic of the Congo, killing all 11 people on board.
 In the 1996 Air Africa crash, the plane failed to take off due to being over maximum takeoff weight. The aircraft overran the runway and plowed into a crowded market, which killed more than 220 people.

Republic of the Congo 
 An Antonov An-26B operated by Air Kasai in the neighboring Democratic Republic of the Congo on a flight from Boende to Kinshasa, on 9 September 2005, crashed 50 km (31 miles) north of Brazzaville, killing all 13 people on board.

Egypt 
 In the 1969 Aswan Ilyushin Il-18 crash, the aircraft banked to right, hit the runway, and burst into flames while attempting to land on Aswan International Airport in Aswan. 100 of 105 people on board were killed.
 United Arab Airlines Flight 749, while descending too low on approach to Cairo Airport, crashed around 5 km from the airport during a thunderstorm on 18 March 1966. All 30 people perished in the accident.
 Pan Am Flight 93 was hijacked as a part of the Dawson's Field hijackings on 6 September 1970 and flown to Beirut and then to Cairo. The aircraft was blown up by the hijackers seconds after the passengers were deplaned.
 Flash Airlines Flight 604 crashed into the Red Sea shortly after takeoff from Sharm el-Sheikh International Airport on 3 January 2004. All 148 aboard were killed. The findings of the crash investigation are controversial, with accident investigators from the different countries involved not agreeing on the cause.
 Libyan Arab Airlines Flight 114 was shot down by Israeli fighter jets on 21 February 1973 after it entered Israeli airspace and its pilots ignored instructions from the fighter pilots. Deaths were 108 of those aboard; one of the five survivors included the copilot.
 KLM Flight 823 crashed and burst into flames while on approach to Cairo International Airport, killing 20 people.

 PIA Flight 705 crashed while attempting to land at Cairo International Airport on 20 May 1965 when the pilot descended too quickly. Six passengers survived; the other 121 people aboard died.
 TWA Flight 903 crashed during a forced emergency landing in the desert near Cairo after an engine caught fire and separated from the aircraft midflight on 1 September 1950. All 55 aboard were killed.

 Metrojet Flight 9268 was destroyed by a bomb while cruising in midair over the Sinai Peninsula, killing all 224 people on board. Russia and the West blamed ISIS for the downing of the aircraft, while Egypt denied such allegations.

Equatorial Guinea
 Aeroflot Flight 418, a Tupolev Tu-154A carrying 46 people, on 1 June 1976, crashed into the mountain in Bioko. Everyone perished.
 In the 2005 Equatorial Express Airlines An-24 crash on the night of 16 July 2005, an Antonov An-24 clipped some trees and crashed due to being overloaded; it is Equatorial Guinea's deadliest plane crash.

Ethiopia
 Ethiopian Air Lines Flight 372 crashed into a mountain south of Jimma on 15 July 1960, killing one on board.
Ethiopian Airlines Flight 604 suffered multiple bird strikes and attempted an emergency landing at Bahir Dar. Upon landing, the plane caught fire, killing 35 people.
Ethiopian Airlines Flight 302, a Boeing 737 MAX 8, crashed shortly after takeoff from Addis Ababa Bole International Airport, killing all 157 people on board on 10 March 2019.

Ghana
 Allied Air Flight 111, a Boeing 727, overran the runway on 2 June 2012, and crashed into a perimeter fence, minibus, cyclist, and taxicab, resulting in 12 deaths on the ground. All four crew members survived.

Guinea
A Chosonminhang-owned Ilyushin Il-62 flying on a charter flight from Pyongyang to Conakry with stopovers in Kabul and Cairo in July 1983, crashed into the Guinean mountains on approach to Conakry International Airport. All 23 occupants died.
 In September 2022, TAP plane from Lisbon crashed into some vehicles as it was landing, at Ahmed Abdullah Tokere airport. There were some deaths; the people in some of the vehicles.

Ivory Coast
 Kenya Airways Flight 431 aircraft was flying at normal takeoff speed, when the Airbus A310 stall warning suddenly went on. The pilots then pushed the controllers, so the stall warning stopped. The plane actually never flew at stall speed. Flight 431 then crashed into the Atlantic Ocean shortly after takeoff from Abidjan on 30 January 2000. Ten passengers survived. Of the 169 fatalities, 146 bodies were recovered, and 103 of those bodies were identified.
 Varig Flight 797 crashed into the jungle near Abidjan after engine failure on 3 January 1987. Of 51 on board, only a single passenger survived.

Kenya 
 The Lufthansa Flight 540 Boeing 747 stalled shortly after takeoff, grazed some bushes and grass, and hit elevated road access. The left wing burst into flames and spread, killing 59 people.
 2006 Kenya plane crash

Liberia 
 Pan Am Flight 151 crashed into a hill in Bong County on 22 June 1951 due to pilot error. All 40 on board were killed.
 Varig Flight 837 was a flight from Fiumicino Airport, Rome,  to Roberts International Airport, Monrovia, Liberia. On 5 March 1967, due to pilot error, the flight crashed during the approach to Runway 04 of Roberts International Airport. Of the 71 passengers and 19 crew on board, 50 passengers, and the flight engineer perished. In addition, five people on the ground were also killed. The aircraft caught fire and was written off. This is the deadliest aviation accident in Liberia.

Libya 
 Central African Airways Flight 890 was a Vickers Viscount carrying 54 people when it crashed into high ground near Benina International Airport on 9 August 1958, killing 36 people. At the time, it was the deadliest plane crash in Libya. Possible pilot fatigue and indisposition were blamed for the crash.
 Afriqiyah Airways Flight 771 Airbus A330 was on approach to Tripoli International Airport on 12 May 2010 when it crashed to the ground on nose-down attitude, slid, disintegrated, and exploded. Among the 104 aboard,  one survived, nine-year-old Ruben van Assouw from the Netherlands.
 Korean Air Flight 803 crashed onto an orchard while on approach to Tripoli International Airport on 27 July 1989 in thick fog and low visibility, killing 79 people. The cause was pilot error.
 Libyan Arab Airlines Flight 1103 Flight 1103 was approaching to Tripoli Airport on 22 December 1992 when it collided with a fighter jet, killing all 157 people aboard the flight, while the two pilots of the fighter jet ejected and survived. Some have contested this conclusion, though,  claiming Muammar Gaddafi ordered the aircraft's destruction.

Mali 
 Air Algérie Flight 5017 was a travelling from Ouagadougou, Burkina Faso, to Algiers, Algeria, when it suddenly banked heavily to the left, spiraled, and crashed into a desert near Gossi, Mali, on 24 July 2014. The McDonnell Douglas MD-80 was carrying 110 passengers and six crew,  all of whom perished.

Mauritania
 Air Mauritanie Flight 625, a Fokker F28 Fellowship, was carrying 93 people when it flew into a sandstorm that limited pilot visibility. The aircraft hit the terrain and killed 80 people in the worst crash involving a Fokker 28 and one of the deadliest in Mauritania.

Mauritius
 In 1960, Qantas Flight 4606, a Lockheed Constellation, lost engine power before taking off at Mauritius Airport. The captain pulled off the power, braked hard, and pulled selected reverse thrust. The airplane bounced over a low embankment, crashed into a gully, and caught fire. The flight was bound for Cocos Island. Of the 50 passengers, all survived.
 South African Airways Flight 295, a Boeing 747-200, was en route to Johannesburg Airport from Taoyuan International Airport with a stopover at Mauritius Airport. In the middle of the flight, the cargo caught fire, leading to the death of some passengers due to suffocation. The aircraft crashed near the east coast of Mauritius, killing all passengers.
 Malaysia Airlines Flight 370: In 2016, the flap on a wing of the Boeing 777 was found on the coast of Mauritius. Other debris was found on other islands in the Indian Ocean. Today, the whereabouts of the rest of the aircraft is still unknown.

Morocco
 Air France Flight 2005: On 12 September 1961, a Sud Aviation Caravelle was on approach to Rabat when it crashed to the ground, killing all 77 people on board.
 In the Agadir air disaster, on 3 August 1975, a Boeing 707-321C crashed into a mountain and exploded, killing all 188 people on board in Morocco's deadliest air disaster. The plane was totally destroyed.
 On 21 August 1994, Royal Air Maroc Flight 630, an ATR 42-312, was carrying 44 people while en route to Mohammed V Airport, when it was deliberately crashed by the pilot, killing all on board.

Namibia 
 South African Airways Flight 228, named Pretoria crashed on 20 April 1968 while on approach to Windhoek, killing 123 people.
 LAM Mozambique Airlines Flight 470 crashed on 29 November 2013 into the Bwabwata National Park in Namibia en route to Quatro de Fevereiro Airport, Angola. All 27 passengers and six crew on board were killed. The final report concluded that the pilot intentionally crashed the plane into terrain.

Niger 
 UTA Flight 772, operated by French airline Union des Transports Aériens, was flying over the Sahara Desert. The McDonnell Douglas DC-10 exploded over Niger on 19 September 1989. All 156 passengers and 14 crew members died, including the wife of the American ambassador to Chad. The investigation found that Libyan terrorists backed by the Libyan government smuggled a bomb in the cargo hold.

Nigeria 
 Nigeria Airways Flight 825, a Vickers VC10, struck trees and exploded while on approach to Lagos International Airport on 20 November 1969, killing all 87 people on board. 
 In the Kano air disaster, a Boeing 707 was landing at Kano Airport on 22 January 1973 when the nose wheel suddenly collapsed. Then, the right main gear started to collapse, as well. The aircraft spun 180°, left the runway, and burst into flames, killing 176.
 ADC Airlines Flight 86 was in a collision course with another plane. The pilots averted the disaster by doing a drastic maneuver, but lost control and crashed. The causes were air traffic control and pilot errors.
 Nigeria Airways Flight 357, a Boeing 737-2F9, was landing at Kaduna Airport on 13 November 1995, when it overran the runway and burst into flames, killing 11 people. The aircraft also was destroyed by the flames.
 EAS Airlines Flight 4226, while taking off from Kano,  overran the runway. The engine ingested a massive amount of dust, causing it to fail. The aircraft then crashed into a heavily populated residential area. Deaths included 73 people aboard the aircraft and 30 people on the ground. 
 Bellview Airlines Flight 210, shortly after takeoff,  immediately nose-dived and crashed at high speed. Everyone on board was killed. The cause remains undetermined.
 Sosoliso Airlines Flight 1145 crash-landed on the runway at Port Harcourt International Airport on 10 December 2005 due to pilot error.
 ADC Airlines Flight 53 crashed immediately after takeoff due to wind shear and pilot error on 29 October 2006.
 Dana Air Flight 992 had its fuel line, which is vital for the operation of the engine, damaged, which caused the engine to fail. The plane then slammed into a neighborhood in Lagos, killing everyone on board.

Rwanda 
 RwandAir Flight 205 crashed into a building after an engine throttle became jammed during landing in Kigali on 12 November 2009, killing one passenger.

Somalia 
 Somali Airlines Flight 40, a few minutes after taking off from Mogadishu, entered violent turbulence. The plane shook violently, went into a spiral dive, and lost control after its right wing separated. It then crashed near Balad, killing all 50 people on board.
 Daallo Airlines Flight 159, an Airbus A321, was en route to Djibouti when a part of its cabin exploded shortly after taking off from Mogadishu's Aden Adde International Airport. Two injuries were reported. A passenger was sucked out from the aircraft and his body was found near Balad.
 2020 East African Express Airways Shootdown 4 May 2020 - An Embraer EMB-120 Brasilia operated by East African Express Airways crashes, killing all 6 on board, allegedly due to a shootdown.
 2022 Jubba Airways Crash - a Fokker 50 operated by Jabba Airways crashed on landing and rolled over in Mogadishu, Somalia.

South Africa 
 13 March 1967 - South African Airways Flight 406 crashed into the Eastern Cape after the pilot suffered a fatal heart attack while on approach to East London, South Africa. All 25 aboard were killed.

 19 October 1986 - 1986 Mozambican Tupolev Tu-134 crash: A Tupolev Tu-134 carrying President of Mozambique Samora Machel crashed into terrain while en route to Maputo, killing 34. Machel was among the dead.
 1 March 1988 - Comair Flight 206 breaks up on approach to Johannesburg due to a bomb, killing all 17 on board.
 24 September 2009 - SA Airlink Flight 8911 crash lands on a sports field after an engine failure, killing 1 on board.

Sudan 
 Sudan Airways Flight 109 crashed, broke apart, and caught fire upon landing at Khartoum on 10 June 2008. The aircraft had been dispatched with its port engine thrust reverser deactivated. This condition caused it to veer to the right when the captain activated reverse thrust in both engines to stop the aircraft within 2,080 meters (6,820 ft) of runway left. Thirty people were confirmed dead.
 Sudan Airways Flight 139 crashed in Port Sudan on 8 July 2003, killing all 117 aboard. The flight crew was not able to see the runway in the low visibility, and crashed when attempting a missed approach. A toddler initially survived the crash, however, but he succumbed to his injuries the next day.

South Sudan 
 1986 Sudan Airways Fokker F-27 shootdown: On 16 August 1986, a Fokker F-27 Friendship 400M was shot down by Sudan People's Liberation Army. The plane disintegrated and crashed near Malakai. Everyone on board was killed.

Togo 
In the 1974 Togo plane crash, a plane carrying several Togolese politicians crashed near Sarakawa. President Gnassingbé Eyadéma was the sole survivor.

Tunisia
 EgyptAir Flight 843: On 7 May 2002, a Boeing 737 carrying 62 people was on approach to Tunisia's capital Tunis when it crashed into a nearby hill. The aircraft broke up, killing 14 people.

Zimbabwe 
 Air Rhodesia Flight 825 was shot down by Zimbabwe People's Revolutionary Army (ZIPRA). Initially, 18 people survived the crash, but the ZIPRA guerrillas found the crash site and massacred 10 people.
 Air Rhodesia Flight 827 also was shot down by ZIPRA guerrillas.

Antarctica
 Air New Zealand Flight 901 crashed into the side of Mount Erebus, Antarctica, on 28 November 1979 for various reasons including pilot error, maintenance crew error, and whiteout conditions. All 257 aboard died.

Asia



Afghanistan
 Bakhtar Afghan Airlines Antonov An-26 shootdown on 4 September 1985, all 52 on board are killed.

 March 19, 1998 - An Ariana Afghan Airlines Boeing 727-228 crashes into a mountain, killing all 45 aboard. 
 Kam Air Flight 904 crashed in the Pamir Mountains during a snow storm on 3 February 2005. All 104 people on board were killed, and the cause of the crash remains under investigation and undetermined.
 Pamir Airways Flight 112 crashed in northern Afghanistan on 17 May 2010, killing 43 or 44 people.
 July 6, 2011 - A Silk Way Airlines Ilyushin Il-76 hits a mountain, killing all 9 aboard. 
 National Airlines Flight 102, a Boeing 747-428BCF crashes after takeoff from Bagram Airfield on April 29, 2013. All 7 crew members are killed. The rope that secured the cargo snapped. The cargo managed to shift and slammed onto the rear bulkhead, causing the plane to lose its control.
 May 18, 2016 - A Silk Way Airlines Antonov An-12, crashes due to engine failure, killing 7.

Armenia
 July 18, 1981 - A Transporte Aéreo Rioplatense Canadair CL-44 and a Soviet Air Defense Forces Sukhoi Su-15 collide in mid-air. All 4 on board the Canadair died. The fighter pilot survived. 
 Belavia Flight 1834 crashed during takeoff from Yerevan's Zvartnots International Airport on 14 February 2008 after suffering mechanical failure due to icing. There were no casualties.

Azerbaijan
 August 18, 1973 - Aeroflot Flight 13, an Antonov An-24B operated by Aeroflot crashes on takeoff due to engine failure, killing 56.
 December 5, 1995 - Azerbaijan Airlines Flight 56 – Shortly after taking off from Nakhchivan Airport, the Tupolev Tu-134's no. 1 engine failed. The pilots seemed to misread it as a failure on engine no 2. Therefore, they shut down engine no 2. After realizing their failure, the pilots gave full power to engine no 2. But the engine had already stopped. The plane banked heavily and crashed into a field. Fifty-two people were killed.
 December 23, 2005 - Azerbaijan Airlines Flight 217 – The Antonov An-140 suffered an instrument failure. While it was returning to Baku, the plane crashed into a beach. All 23 people on board were killed in the disaster.

Bahrain
 Air France Douglas DC-4 accidents on 12 June 1950, a flight from Saigon to Paris crashed in the Persian Gulf while on approach to Bahrain International Airport killing 46 of the 52 on board. On 14 June 1950, a second Douglas DC-4 operating on the same flight route, crashed in the Persian Gulf while on approach to Bahrain International Airport, killing 40 of 53 on board.
 Gulf Air Flight 072 crashed in the Persian Gulf while on approach to Bahrain International Airport on 23 August 2000, due to pilot error and spatial disorientation, killing all 143 people on board.

Bangladesh
 September 28, 1988 - Japan Airlines Flight 472, a Japan Airlines Douglas DC-8 is hijacked. Everyone survives. 
 August 5, 1984 - A Biman Bangladesh Airlines Fokker F27 crashed into a marsh near Zia International Airport (now Shahjalal International Airport) in Dhaka, Bangladesh while landing in poor weather. With a total death toll of 49 people, it is the deadliest aviation disaster to occur on Bangladeshi soil and also the airlines' worst accident.
 March 9, 2016 - A True Aviation Antonov An-26B, crashes into the Bay of Bengal, killing 3.

Cambodia
 PMTair Flight 241 – On June 25, 2007, an Antonov An-24B carrying 22 people crashed and burst into flames in upside-down condition. No one survived the crash. An official investigation was carried out by the Cambodian Government and blamed pilot error as the cause of the accident.
 Vietnam Airlines Flight 815 – On September 3, 1997, a Tupolev Tu-134B-3 operated by Vietnam's flag carrier Vietnam Airlines crashed onto the ground, skidded over dry rice paddies and exploded, just 800 meters from the runway. Only one survived. The first officer and the flight engineer had warned the captain twice to abort the landing. The captain did not do so. An official investigation blamed pilot error as the cause of the accident.

China
 31 March 1922 - A Beijing-Han Airlines Handley Page O/7 crashes struck trees and crashed upon landing. All 14 on board died.
 August 24, 1938 - A China National Aviation Corporation Douglas DC-2 was shot down by Japanese aircraft, killing 14.
 July 23, 1954 - A Cathay Pacific Airways Douglas C-54A-10-DC Skymaster was shot down, killing 10.
 26 April 1982 - CAAC Flight 3303, while on approach to Guilin Qifengling Airport, crashed into a mountain in heavy rain near Yangshuo, killing all 112 people on board. 
 December 24, 1982 - CAAC Flight 2311, a CAAC Airlines Ilyushin Il-18D was destroyed by fire after landing, killing 25.
 September 14, 1983 - A CAAC Airlines Hawker Siddeley Trident and a PLAAF Harbin H-5 collided at Guilin Qifengling Airport, killing at least 11.
 18 January 1988 - China Southwest Airlines Flight 4146's engine No. 4 detached due to an in-flight fire causing a loss of control, killing all 108 on board.
 2 October 1990 - In the 1990 Guangzhou Baiyun airport collisions Xiamen Airlines Flight 8301, a Boeing 737, was hijacked while attempting to land.  It sideswiped a Boeing 707, then the aircraft crashed into a Boeing 757. 128 people died in the incident.
 31 July 1992 - China General Aviation Flight 7552 lost control upon take-off and crashes into a pond nearby, killing 107 people.
 24 November 1992 - China Southern Airlines Flight 3943 was descending when the flight crews accidentally caused an engine thrust asymmetry. The plane rolled to the right and lost control, then it crashed into a mountain near Guilin. All 141 on board died.
 July 23, 1993 - China Northwest Airlines Flight 2119, while rolling on the runway for take-off, suffers a right-side flap actuator failure, causing the flaps to retract. The crew aborted the take-off, and the plane overran the runway and crashed into a lake, killing 55 people.
 26 October 1993 - China Eastern Airlines Flight 5398 overran the runway during an attempted go-around and stops in a pond. 2 people died.
 November 13, 1993 - China Northern Airlines Flight 6901, while on approach to Ürümqi Diwopu International Airport, the pilots received a "pull up!" alert. Rather than pulling the nose up, the captain asked the first officer the meaning of the word. The plane crashed into terrain, killing 12 people.
 June 6, 1994 - China Northwest Airlines Flight 2303 was climbing when the autopilot responsible for the bank and yaw control malfunctioned, causing subsequent loss of control. The aircraft overstressed, and the airframe could not handle the pressure. It broke up in mid-air and crashed near Xian. 160 people were killed. 
 May 8, 1997 - China Southern Airlines Flight 3456 was on approach to Shenzen. After two failed landing attempts, the pilots tried a third attempt. It crashed into terrain and broke up in severe weather conditions. 35 people were killed. Pilot error was the cause of the accident.
 February 24, 1999 - China Southwest Airlines Flight 4509 lost pitch control and dived, leading to an in-flight breakup, killing 61. The loss of control was caused by poor maintenance.
 April 15, 1999 - Korean Air Cargo Flight 6316 nosedove into the town of Xinzhuang due to pilot error. 8 people were killed, including 5 on the ground.
 June 22, 2000 - Wuhan Airlines Flight 343 was a Xian Y-7 carrying 42 people when it was struck by lightning and crashed into a village, killing 49 people including 7 on the ground. Lightning strike was the cause of the accident.
 May 7, 2002 - China Northern Airlines Flight 6136 took off when one of its passengers, Zhen Piling, set fire on board. The fire spread, causing the MD-82 to lose control and crash into Bohai Bay. All 103 passengers and 9 crew were killed in the incident.
 21 November 2004 - China Eastern Flight 5210 was taking off when suddenly it crashed into a park, killing all 53 people on board and 2 on the ground. The cause of the accident was ice accumulation on the wings.
 November 28, 2009 - Avient Aviation Flight 324, an Avient Aviation McDonnell Douglas MD-11F crashes on takeoff due to an improper flap and slat setting, killing 3.
 24 August 2010 - Henan Airlines Flight 8387 an Embraer E-190 carrying 96 people was approaching Lindu Airport when it crashed into terrain and burst into flames. 44 people were killed, the other 52 survivors were injured. The crew ignored the safety rules while landing in foggy conditions.
21 March 2022 - China Eastern Airlines Flight 5735 was a Boeing 737 89P carrying 123 people when it nosedived towards the ground above Teng County, killing all 123 passengers and 9 crew members on board. The reason of the crash is still unknown.
 12 May 2022 - Tibet Airlines Flight 9833 aborts a take-off from Chongqing and veers off the runway. A fire erupts, but all 122 occupants evacuate safely.

Georgia 
 Aeroflot Flight 207, an Ilyushin Il-14M operated by Aeroflot crashes in the mountain of Recch on 10 June 1960. All 24 passengers and 7 crew died. 
 Aeroflot Flight 244, an Antonov An-24B operated by Aeroflot was hijacked on 15 October 1970. 1 flight attendant died and 3 others were injured. 
 Aeroflot Flight 6833, a Tupolev Tu-134-A operated by Aeroflot was hijacked on 18 November 1983. 7 people die.

September 1993 crashes
 Georgian Tu-134A crash (September 20) - A parked empty aircraft was destroyed by missiles. No one was injured. 
 Transair Georgia Crash (September 21) - Shot down on approach at Sukhumi Babushara Airport. All 22 passengers and 5 crew died. 
 Orbi Georgian Airways Crash(22 September) – Shot down as it was trying to land at Sukhumi. 108 people died. 
 Transair Georgia Crash (September 23) - Shot at during boarding. 1 crew member died.

Hong Kong SAR 
 CAAC Flight 301 clipped approach lights, overran the runway, crashed into the runway, and slid through the grass, killing 7 people.
 China Airlines Flight 605 overran the runway at Kai Tak International Airport on 4 November 1993. The pilot failed to initiate a mandatory missed approach procedure after observing severe airspeed fluctuations. Nobody on board was injured in the incident.
 China Airlines Flight 642 crashed while attempting to land at Hong Kong International Airport on 22 August 1999 during a typhoon. The aircraft flipped and caught fire, killing three on board. There were 312 survivors.
 Thai Airways International Flight 601 undershoots the runway on landing and impacts water killing 24.

India

Indonesia 

 April 11, 1955 - Kashmir Princess, a Lockheed L-749A Constellation operated by Air India is bombed and crashes into the sea killing 16.
 July 16, 1957 - KLM Flight 844, a Lockheed 1049E Super Constellation operated by KLM crashes into the sea after takeoff killing 58.
 February 16, 1967 - Garuda Indonesia Flight 708, a Lockheed L-188 Electra operated by Garuda Indonesia crashes short of the runway, killing 22.
 November 10, 1971 - A Merpati Nusantara Airlines Vickers Viscount 828  crashes into the sea killing all 69 on board. 
 September 24, 1975 - Garuda Indonesia Flight 150, a Fokker F-28 Fellowship operated by Garuda Indonesia Airways crashes into trees on approach killing 26.
 July 11, 1979 - A Garuda Indonesia Fokker F28 Mk-1000 crashes into Mount Sibayak killing all 61 on board.
 March 28, 1981 - Garuda Indonesia Flight 206, a McDonnell Douglas DC-9 operated by Garuda Indonesia is hijacked killing 5.
 March 20, 1982 - A Garuda Indonesia Fokker F28 Mk-1000  overruns the runway on landing killing all 27 on board. 
 June 24, 1982 - British Airways Flight 9, a Boeing 747-236B operated by British Airways flies into a volcanic cloud causing all four engines to fail. Pilots successfully restart the engines and land the aircraft. Everyone survives.
 April 4, 1987 - Garuda Indonesia Flight 035, a Douglas DC-9-32 operated by Garuda Indonesia crashes on approach killing 23.
 December 7, 1996 - Dirgantara Air Service Flight 5940, CASA C-212 Aviocar operated by Dirgantara Air Service crashes due to engine failure killing 18.
 September 26, 1997 - Garuda Indonesia Flight 152, an Airbus A300B4-220 operated by Garuda Indonesia crashes high terrain on approach killing all 234 people on board. 
 November 18, 2000 - Dirgantara Air Service Flight 3130, a Britten Norman BN-2 Islander operated by Dirgantara Air Service crashes into a forest due to overloading. Everyone survives. 
 January 14, 2002 - Lion Air Flight 386, a Boeing 737-200 operated by Lion Air crashes on takeoff due to an inappropriate flap setting. Everyone survives. 
 January 16, 2002 - Garuda Indonesia Flight 421, a Boeing 737-3Q8 operated by Garuda Indonesia ditches into Bengawan Solo River due to dual engine failure killing 1.
 November 30, 2004 - Lion Air Flight 583, McDonnell Douglas MD-82 operated by Lion Air overruns the runway on landing due to pilot error, killing 25.
 September 5, 2005 - Mandala Airlines Flight 091, a Boeing 737-230 Adv crashes shortly after takeoff due to an improper flap and slat setting, killing 149.
 March 4, 2006 - Lion Air Flight 8987, a McDonnell Douglas MD-82 operated by Lion Air veers off the runway on landing due to differential thrust. Everyone survives. 
 December 24, 2006 - Lion Air Flight 792, a Boeing 737-400 operated by Lion Air lands hard causing the landing gear to collapse. Everyone survives. 
 January 1, 2007 - Adam Air Flight 574, a Boeing 737-4Q8 operated by Adam Air breaks up in mid-air and crashes into the sea due to pilot error, killing all 102 on board. 
 February 21, 2007 - Adam Air Flight 172, a Boeing 737-33A operated by Adam Air lands hard and suffers structural damage. No one is killed. 
 March 7, 2007 - Garuda Indonesia Flight 200, a Boeing 737-497 operated by Garuda Indonesia overruns the runway on landing killing 21.
 April 9, 2009 - An Aviastar British Aerospace 146-300 crashes into Pikei Hill killing all 6.
 November 10, 2010 - Lion Air Flight 712, a Boeing 737-400 operated by Lion Air overruns the runway on landing. Everyone survives. 
 May 9, 2012 - A Sukhoi Superjet 100-95 crashes into Mount Salak killing all 45 on board.
 April 13, 2013 - Lion Air Flight 904, a Boeing 737-8GP operated by Lion Air crashes into the sea on approach. Everyone survives. 
 December 28, 2014 - Indonesia AirAsia Flight 8501, an Airbus A320-216 operated by Indonesia AirAsia stalls and crashes into the Java Sea killing all 162 on board. 
 October 2, 2015 - Aviastar Flight 7503, a de Havilland Canada DHC-6 Twin Otter operated by Aviastar crashes into Latimojong Mountain killing all 10 on board.
 April 4, 2016 - Batik Air Flight 7703, a Boeing 737-8GP(WL) operated by Batik Air collides with an ATR 42-600 operated by TransNusa Air Services crossing the runway. Everyone survives.
 October 29, 2018 - Lion Air Flight 610, a Boeing 737 MAX 8 operated by Lion Air crashes into the Java Sea shortly after takeoff due to MCAS flaw, killing all 189 on board. 
January 9, 2021 - Sriwijaya Air Flight 182, a Boeing 737-524 operated by Sriwijaya Air nosedives into the Java Sea minutes after takeoff. All 62 on board are presumed dead. An investigation is ongoing.

Iran 

6 September 1929 – Imperial Airways de Havilland DH.66 Hercules G-EBMZ stalls when it flares too early while attempting a night landing at Jask Airport in Jask, Persia. It crashes and bursts into flames when its wing fuel tanks ruptured and emergency flares in its wingtips ignite the fuel. Both crew members and one of the three passengers died.
4 December 1946 – Aeroflot Lisunov Li-2 crashed at Mashhad, Iran, killing 24.
14 September 1950 – An Iran Air Douglas C-47 Skytrain (registration EP-AAG) crashed on takeoff from Mehrabad Airport, killing all eight on board.
1 December 1950 – An Iran Air C-47A (registration EP-AAJ) struck a mountain near Chamaran en route to Tehran from Tabriz, killing all eight on board.
22 December 1951 – An Egypt Air SNCASE Languedoc circled Tehran twice in a snowstorm and crashed 10 km W of Tehran, killing 22 on board.
25 December 1952 – Iran Air Douglas DC-3; Tehran, Iran: 27 fatalities and two survivors.
10 September 1958 – A Mariner P-303 was being ferried to the Netherlands from Biak, Indonesia. Due to technical problems, a forced landing was carried out at Abadan, Iran. About two weeks later, repairs had been accomplished, and the aircraft took off. Shortly after takeoff, an oil leak was observed on engine number one. While on finals for landing at Abadan, the aircraft suddenly lost height and crashed, killing all aboard. It appeared that the remaining propeller reversed thrust, causing the crew to lose control.
15 March 1963 – A TMA Cargo Avro York crashed seven miles southeast of Karaj, killing all 4 on board.
15 March 1974 – A Sud Aviation Caravelle of Sterling Airlines damaged beyond repair while taxiing in Mehrabad International Airport, causing 15 casualties.
21 January 1980 – Iran Air Boeing 727-86; near Tehran, Iran. The aircraft hit high ground in a snowstorm during the approach to land. All 8 crew members and 120 passengers were killed.
3 July 1988 – Iran Air Flight 655, an Iranian passenger jet carrying 290 passengers, is shot down over the Persian Gulf by the United States Navy guided-missile cruiser  killing all aboard including 66 children.
24 May 1991 – A forced landing near Kermanshah, Iran, due to fuel shortage had to be made after three missed approaches by Soviet Metro Cargo Ilyushin Il-76. 4 on-board casualties.
8 February 1993 – Iran Air Tours Flight 962 a Tupolev Tu-154 was departing on a non-scheduled flight from Mehrabad International Airport, Tehran, to Mashhad International Airport when it became involved in a mid-air collision with an Iranian Air Force Sukhoi Su-24 fighter plane that was on approach to the same airport. All 12 crew members and 119 passengers on board, plus both pilots of the Su-24, were killed, totaling 133 fatalities.
12 October 1994 – Iran Aseman Airlines Flight 746, a Fokker F28 Fellowship (registered EP-PAV) en route from Isfahan to Tehran suffered a sudden loss of power in both engines at 23:05 local time, 35 minutes after take-off from Isfahan International Airport. The aircraft went into an uncontrolled descent and crashed near Natanz, killing all 59 passengers and 7 crew members on board.
May 17, 2001 – A Faraz Qeshm Airlines Yakovlev Yak-40 departed from Tehran on a flight to Gorgan Airport carrying 30 people; including the Iranian Transport Minister Rahman Dadman, two deputy ministers and seven more members of parliament. It was forced to divert due to bad weather conditions and was later discovered crashed in the Alborz Mountains, near Sari, Iran. All on board perished.
12 February 2002 – Iran Air Tours Flight 956, a Tupolev Tu-154, crashed into the Sefid Kooh mountains during heavy rain, snow, and dense fog while descending for Khorramabad Airport. All twelve crew members and 107 passengers were killed.
23 December 2002 – Aeromist-Kharkiv Flight 2137, (registration UR-14003), an Antonov An-140 crashed near Ardestan, Iran, killing all 44 on board.
20 April 2005 – Saha Airlines Flight 171, a Boeing 707-320C, registration EP-SHE, flying from Kish Island, crashed on landing at Mehrabad Airport, Tehran following an unstabilized approach with a higher than recommended airspeed. Gear and/or a tire failed after touchdown and the flight overran the far end of the runway. Of the 12 crew and 157 passengers, 3 passengers were killed.
1 September 2006 – Iran Air Tours Flight 945, A Tupolev Tu-154 from Bandar Abbas Airport with 11 crew and 137 passengers on board burst into flames upon landing at Mashhad International Airport, Iran killing 28 of those on board.
15 July 2009 – Caspian Airlines Flight 7908, a Tupolev Tu-154M, was traveling from Tehran to Yerevan when one of its engines suffered a catastrophic failure. The engine's explosive disintegration severed the hydraulic lines and the fuel lines. The hot hydraulic fluid contacted oxygen and fuel, resulting in a fire that ultimately caused the aircraft to lose its control. The aircraft crashed, killing all 168 people (156 passengers, 12 crew) on board.
24 July 2009 – Aria Air Flight 1525, an Ilyushin IL-62M, (registration UP-I6208), crashed on landing at Mashhad International Airport, killing 16 out of 173 on board.
24 January 2010 – Taban Air Flight 6437, a Tupolev Tu-154, crashed whilst making an emergency landing at Mashhad International Airport due to a medical emergency; all 157 and 13 crew survived the accident with 42 receiving minor injuries.
9 January 2011 – Iran Air Flight 277; a Boeing 727, (registration EP-IRP), on a scheduled domestic service from Tehran to Urmia, Iran, crashed after aborting its approach into Urmia Airport in poor weather. Of 105 aboard, 77 were killed.
18 October 2011 – Iran Air Flight 742; a Boeing 727, (registration EP-IRR), on a scheduled service from Moscow, Russia, to Tehran, made an emergency landing at Tehran's Mehrabad International Airport after the nose landing gear failed to deploy. All 113 on board escaped injury.
10 August 2014 – Sepahan Airlines Flight 5915 an IrAn-140-100 (registration EP-GPA), was taking off when one of its engines malfunctioned. The aircraft lost its altitude, skidded, crashed into a wall, and burst into flames. The wreckage then stopped on a highway. 40 people were killed.

18 February 2018 – Iran Aseman Airlines Flight 3704 an ATR 72-212, (registration EP-ATS), during its approach to Yasuj Airport, crashed into Mount Dena in the Zagros Mountains, killing all 60 passengers and 6 crew members on board.
11 March 2018 – 2018 Iran Bombardier Challenger crash ; Başaran Holding Bombardier Challenger, (registration TC-TRB), crashed, in the Helen mountains  at Zagros Mountains at Iranian soil, while returning to Turkey from the aholiday with Parham Normandi United Arab Emirates.
14 January 2019 – Saha Airline Boeing 707, (registration EP-CPP), crashed at Fath Air Base, near Karaj, killing all 16 people on board. This aircraft was also the last civil Boeing 707 in operation.
8 January 2020 – Ukraine International Airlines Flight 752, a Boeing 737-8KV operated by Ukraine International Airlines is shot down by a missile shortly after takeoff killing all 176 people on board.
27 January 2020 - Caspian Airlines Flight 6936 overruns the runway while landing at Mahshahr Airport. Everybody survives.

Iraq
22 November 2003 - A DHL Airbus A300 suffers a missile strike, causing loss of hydraulic pressure. The plane lands safely at Baghdad International Airport.
9 January 2007 - An AerianTur-M Antonov An-26 crashes on approach to Balad Air Base. 34 people are killed.

Japan 
 All Nippon Airways Flight 60 crashed into Tokyo Bay while on approach to land at Tokyo International Airport on 4 February 1966 killing 133 people in the deadliest single-plane incident until 1971. The cause of the crash is undetermined.
 All Nippon Airways Flight 61 – Hijacked and taken back over Tokyo, Japan.
 BOAC Flight 911 – The aircraft was flying above Mount Fuji when it encountered a clear-air turbulence. The aircraft spiraled down, and part of the aircraft detached one by one as the aircraft started to lose control. It then crashed into the ground, killing everyone on board. A photo of the aircraft falling was captured by the photographer. 
 Toa Domestic Airlines Flight 63 – The aircraft, a NAMC YS-11A-217, crashed into the face of Yokotsu Mountain, all 68 people on board were killed.
 Canadian Pacific Airlines Flight 402 – The plane was on landing phase at Tokyo International Airport in fog. However, the plane was descending below the glideslope (similar to Asiana Airlines Flight 214). The plane then hit approach lights and struck a seawall. Only 8 people survived the crash.
 Japan Airlines Flight 350 – Flight 350 was on approach to Haneda Airport when the pilot deliberately nose-dived the plane to crash it. The pilot was then subdued by other flight crews, yet the plane remained descending. It then crashed into Tokyo Bay. The pilot who deliberately nose-dived the plane was suffering from mental illness before the incident.

 Japan Airlines Flight 123 – Flight 123 was flying over Japan when part of its vertical stabilizer detached, causing some hydraulic loss which led to losing control. Flight crews tried to recover the plane and head back to Tokyo, but it was too late. The Boeing 747 then crashed into Mount Takamagahara, Japan. Only 4 people survived. It is the deadliest single-aircraft crash to date and the deadliest in Japan. Investigators concluded that the rear pressure bulkhead damaged by a tailstrike a few years earlier, resulting in the detachment.
 China Airlines Flight 140 stalled, impacted the runway, exploded and burst into flames. Only 7 people survived. The first officer accidentally pushed the TO/GA button (Takeoff/Go-around button) which raises the throttle position to the same as take offs and go-arounds. The pilots tried to correct the situation, but their action causing the autopilot to raise the nose sharply, causing it to stall.
 Garuda Indonesia Flight 865 was a DC-10 taking off from Fukuoka when one of its engines had a failure. The pilots then rejected take-off but were too late. The plane overshot the runway, skidded, and burst into flames. The accident claimed 3 lives.
 Japan Airlines Flight 907 and Japan Airlines Flight 958 – Nearly collided near Yaizu, Japan.

 China Airlines Flight 120 – A bolt that had come loose from the slat track managed to puncture the fuel tank, causing a fire after normal landing.

Kazakhstan
 Aeroflot Flight 4225 – Shortly after takeoff, the Tupolev Tu-154B-2 encountered a massive blow of wind from above, causing it to stall and lose altitude rapidly. The plane stalled, nose-dived, slid, and exploded near Alma-Ata. All 166 people were killed in Kazakhstan's deadliest plane crash.
 Aeroflot Flight 5463 – The aircraft crashed into the western slope of Dolan Mountain while on approach to Almaty. All 90 passengers and crews on board were killed.

 SCAT Airlines Flight 760 – A Bombardier CRJ200 operated by Kazakh-based SCAT Airlines suddenly nose-dived and impacted terrain while on final approach to Almaty International Airport. All 21 people aboard killed. Investigators concluded that an elevator deflection caused the crash. However, they could not determine the cause of the deflection.

Kyrgyzstan 
 Avia Traffic Company Flight 768 – The Boeing 737 touched the ground too hard, overrun the runway and slid, detaching the engines and causing some significant damages to the plane. Although the plane suffered great damage, none killed.
 Iran Aseman Airlines Flight 6895 – The Boeing 737 operated by Itek Air was on final approach to Dushanbe on 24 August 2008 when it crashed into terrain. Only 22 people survived the crash. An investigation by Russian investigators concluded that the pilots maintained the aircraft altitude below the minima, in other words, below the glideslope.
 Turkish Airlines Flight 6491 – A Boeing 747-400F crashed into a residential area upon attempting landing in thick fog in Bishkek, Kyrgyzstan on 16 January 2017. The 4 crew members and 35 people on the ground were killed.

Laos 
 Lao Airlines Flight 301 an ATR 72-600 operated by Lao Airlines was about to land. As they approach, the plane crashed to the ground, bounced a few times, skidded, and plunged into the Mekong River killing all 49 people on board the aircraft. Investigators concluded that the cause of the accident was due to pilot error while approaching.

Lebanon 
 Ariana Afghan Airlines Flight 202 On November 21, 1959, a Douglas DC-4 carrying 27 people crashed into the side of a hill at hills of Aramoun near Beirut shortly after take-off. Only one person survived.

Malaysia 

Malaysian Airline System Flight 653 – The plane was hijacked en route from Penang to Kuala Lumpur. It eventually crashed at Tanjung Kupang, killing all 100 on board.
Double Six Crash – a Sabah Air aircraft crashed killing state ministers on board.
Malaysian Airline System Flight 684 – The Airbus A300 struck trees, slid, and struck a stream embankment. The aircraft lost its nose and both of its engines. All aboard survived the crash.
Japan Air Lines Flight 715 – The McDonnell Douglas DC-8 descended below MDA of 750 feet, then at 300 feet it crashed into the side of a hill 4 miles from the airport, near an estate called Ladang Elmina. It broke on impact killing 34 out of 77.
Malaysia Airlines Flight 2133 – The Fokker 50 crashed into a shantytown in Tawau, killing 34 people.
Royal Brunei Airlines Flight 238 – The Dornier 228 crashed into the forest of Lambir Hills National Park near Miri, killing everyone on board.
Malaysia Airlines Flight 370 – The Boeing 777-200ER disappeared on 8 March 2014 while flying from Kuala Lumpur International Airport to Beijing Capital International Airport. All 227 passengers and 12 crew on board were presumed dead.

Myanmar
 On 25 March 1978, a Burma Airways Fokker F-27 Friendship 200 lost height and crashed into a paddy field shortly after take-off from Yangon-Mingaladon Airport, killing all 48 people on board.
 On Thursday, 24 January 1980, a Burma Airways Fairchild FH-227B struck the roof of a tobacco factory and crashed following an apparent engine failure in mid-air, killing 43 people. One person survived the crash.
 On 21 June 1987, a Burma Airways Fokker F-27 Friendship 200 crashed into a mountain shortly after take-off from Heho Airport, killing all 45 people on board. 
 On 11 October 1987, a Burma Airways Fokker F-27 Friendship 500 flew into a mountain and exploded, killing all 49 people on board.
 Myanmar Airways Flight 635 – While on approach to Tachilek Airport, the Fokker F-27 Friendship crashed into a mountain, killing all 36 people on board.
 Air Bagan ATR 72 overran the runway and crashes at Putao Airport in 2008. Two injured during the crash.
 Air Bagan Flight 11 – The Fokker 100 crashed into a paddy field and burst into flames after the pilots thought the road was the runway. Two people were killed, including one on the ground.
 On 7 June 2017, a Myanmar Air Force Shaanxi Y-8F-200 stalled and crashed off the coast of Dawei after ice accumulated on its wings, killing all 122 people on board.

Nepal 

 Thai Airways International Flight 311 – On 31 July 1992, an Airbus A310 on the route, registration HS-TID, crashed on approach to Tribhuvan International Airport in Kathmandu. All 113 on board were killed in the second-deadliest plane crash in Nepal.
 Pakistan International Airlines Flight 268 – On 28 September 1992, a Pakistan International Airlines Airbus A300B4-203 crashed into a mountain while on final approach to Kathmandu's Tribhuvan, killing all 167 people on board in the worst aviation accident in Nepal.
 Necon Air Flight 128 – On 5 September 1999, a BAe 748-501 Super 2B (9N-AEG) of Necon Air, crashed while approaching Tribhuvan International Airport on a flight from Pokhara to Kathmandu. The aircraft collided with a telecommunications tower, killing all 15 occupants of the plane.
 Indian Airlines Flight 814 – On 26 December 1999, an Indian Airlines plane was hijacked en route from Kathmandu to Delhi. The aircraft ended up in Kandahar, Afghanistan. Indian Airlines suspended all flights to and from Nepal for some time, fearing a lack of security at check-in.
 Yeti Airlines Flight 103 – On 8 October 2008, a De Havilland Canada DHC-6 Twin Otter carrying 19 people crashed into terrain in bad weather. The Captain was the sole survivor of the crash. An investigation concluded that the cause of the accident was CFIT.
 Agni Air Flight 101 – On 24 August 2010, an Agni Air Dornier 228-101 crashed into the mountain while carrying 14 people. No one on board made it out alive. Investigation concludes that the pilots became spatially disoriented after the plane's attitude indicator gave the wrong information to the pilots following a generator failure. There was a backup generator, but it was exhausted early, due to the crew using an outdated checklist and not adhering to a checklist.
 2010 Okhaldhunga Twin Otter crash – On 15 December 2010, a Tara Air DHC-6 crashed into Bilandu forest just five minutes after take-off. All 22 passengers and crews perished.
 Buddha Air Flight 103, On 25 September 2011, a Buddha Air Beechcraft 1900D, struck terrain while on approach to Tribhuvan International Airport. There were 16 passengers and three crew members on board. Initial reports stated there was one survivor, who died en route to the hospital. At the time of the crash, the weather was overcast with very low clouds and flights were operating under visual flight rules. The aircraft was on the base leg of the approach following a sightseeing flight.
 2012 Agni Air Dornier 228 crash – On 14 May 2012,  an Agni Air operated Dornier 228 crashed into rocky terrain after a failed go-around. 15 out of 21 passengers and crews were killed, including Indian child actress Taruni Sachdev. Tragically, she died on her birthday.
 Sita Air Flight 601 – On 28 September 2012, a Sita Air Dornier 228 suffered an engine failure in mid-air. The pilots tried to make their way back to the airport but failed. The plane crashed and burst into flames, killing all 19 people on board.

 Nepal Airlines Flight 555 – On 16 May 2013, a Nepal Airlines DHC-6 overran the runway at Jomsom Airport with 21 passengers on board. The plane then went down a hill and impacted the Gandaki River nose-first. However, all on board survived.
 Nepal Airlines Flight 183 – On 16 February 2014, a Nepal Airlines DHC-6 crashed into the jungle near Dikhara, killing all 18 people on board. CFIT was the cause of the crash.
 Tara Air Flight 193 – On 24 February 2016, a Tara Air DHC-6 crashed into the mountainside near Dana village, Myagdi district, killing all 23 people on board.
 2016 Air Kasthamandap crash – On 26 February 2016, an Air Kasthamandap PAC 750XL crash-landed in Chilkhaya, two people were killed in the crash.
 Summit Air Flight 409 – On 27 May 2017, a Summit Air Let L-140 crashed short of the runway threshold while attempting a landing at Tenzing–Hillary Airport in Nepal. The captain and the first officer died as a result of the accident, another crew member received injuries.
 US-Bangla Airlines Flight 211 – On March 12, 2018, a US-Bangla Airlines Bombardier Q400, on an international flight from Dhaka to Kathmandu suffered a hard landing, veered off the runway and plowed into a field at Tribhuvan International Airport. 51 people were killed in the disaster.
 Yeti Airlines Flight 691 - On January 15, 2023, a Yeti Airlines ATR 72-500 crashed during a domestic flight from Kathmandu to Pokhara on approach to land. The cause of the accident is currently under investigation. All 72 occupants were killed in the crash.

Pakistan 
 PIA Flight 631 – The aircraft, a Fokker F027 Friendship, struck a hill near Maidan, Pakistan. All 26 people on board perished in the crash.
 Pakistan International Airlines Flight 404 – A Fokker F27 Friendship operated by Pakistan national airline Pakistan International Airlines went missing while en route to Islamabad. Same as the fate of MH370, the plane, until today, was never found. 
 Pan Am Flight 73 – Hijacked in Karachi, Pakistan.
 PIA Flight 688 – An engine failure occurred in-flight. However, the pilots apparently lost their spatial awareness. The pilots became confused, and the aircraft then crashed in an inverted attitude. All aboard were killed
 AirBlue Flight 202 – an Airbus A321 was on final approach to Islamabad's Benazir Bhutto International Airport when it crashed into Margalla Hills, killing all 152 people on board in Pakistan's deadliest plane crash. The Captain forgot to pull the heading indicator button, causing the plane to fly straight into the hill. The first officer aware of this, but failed to inform the captain.
 Bhoja Air Flight 213 – a Boeing 737 was carrying 127 people when a microburst occurred. The plane lost altitude rapidly. Later on, it encountered a second microburst, in which both pilots failed to respond appropriately. The plane crashed into the ground and exploded into pieces, killing all on board.
 Pakistan International Airlines Flight 661 – on 7 December 2016, flight PK 661 crashed in Havelian en route to Islamabad from Chitral killing 47 total, including famous Pakistani former singer and converted preacher of Islam Junaid Jamshed and his family members along with two sky marshals, five crew members and the Deputy Commissioner of District of Chitral.
 Pakistan International Airlines Flight 8303 Airbus 320 crashed on houses near Karachi airport 22 May 2020, the Plane was carrying 82 passengers and 9 PIA staff members from Lahore to Karachi.

Philippines 
 Philippine Airlines Flight 158 – the BAC One-Eleven crashed into hills while on approach to Manila International Airport. 45 people were killed.
 Philippine Airlines Flight 215 – Flight 215 was en route to Manila when terrorists detonated a bomb that had been placed in the plane's lavatory. The plane tore apart, exploding into pieces, killing all 36 people on board.
 Philippine Airlines Flight 206 – A Hawker Siddeley HS 748 impacted a mountain while in bad weather, killing all 50 people on board.
 Philippine Airlines Flight 443 – The Short 360-300 crashed into Mount Gurain, killing all 15 people on board.
 Cebu Pacific Flight 387 – Crashed on the slopes of Mount Sumagaya. All 104 people on board perished.
 Philippine Airlines Flight 137 – Flight 137 was landing at Bacolod City Domestic Airport when it overran the runway and plowed into houses, killing 3 people on the ground.
 Asian Spirit Flight 100 – the Let L-410 Turbolet crashed into a mountain while carrying 17 people. Due to the massive impact force, the aircraft was pulverized. None on board made it out alive.
 Air Philippines Flight 541 – Flight 541 was due to land to Francisco Bangoy International Airport in Davao City when it suddenly crashed into a coconut plantation 500 feet above mean sea level. All 131 occupants on board the aircraft were killed in the worst air crash in Philippines history.
 Philippine Airlines Flight 812 – Flight 812 was hijacked while at cruising altitude. Later, the hijacker wanted to escape by jumping from the plane with a parachute. Before he was about to jump, he panicked and clung to the rear door, and a flight attendant pushed him out of the plane.
 Laoag International Airlines Flight 585 – The aircraft, a Fokker F-27 Friendship, was taking off from Manila when one of its engines suddenly failed. The pilots then decided to ditch the plane in Manila Bay but failed. The plane broke up and 19 people drowned. The cause was due to pilot error.
Philippine Airlines Flight 475 was a scheduled passenger flight from Manila's Ninoy Aquino International Airport to Butuan Bancasi Airport which overran the runway at Butuan Airport. Everyone survived with 19 people injured.

Qatar 
 Alia Royal Jordanian Flight 600 – 14 March 1979 – crashed on landing at Doha International Airport due to wind shear killing 45 passengers.
 Saudia Flight 162 – 22 December 1980 – suffered an explosive decompression. Its cabin floor and fuselage ripped apart, ejected two passengers out of their seats and fell to their death.

Saudi Arabia 
 PIA Flight 740 – Shortly after taking off from Jeddah International Airport, the Boeing 707-340C suffered an in-flight fire. The fire spread into the cabin, causing mass panic among the passengers. The plane then crashed, killing all 156 people on board.
 Middle East Airlines Flight 438 – Disintegrated in flight from an explosive detonation.
 Iraqi Airways Flight 163 – Hijacked on the way from Baghdad to Amman, a hand grenade exploded in the cabin. The crews initiated an emergency descent, later on another grenade went off in the cockpit, causing it to crash, killing 63 people.
 Saudia Flight 163 – Just after taking off from Riyadh, the cargo hold of the flight caught fire. The pilots however successfully land the plane. Shockingly, instead of conducting an evacuation immediately, the pilots tried to taxi the aircraft. The plane then stopped with no further contact. After hours of silence from the plane, rescuers opened the plane's door and found everyone on board had been killed due to smoke inhalation. 
 Nigeria Airways Flight 2120 (Jeddah, 1991) – The plane was carrying hajj pilgrimage when one of its tires caught fire just after takeoff. The pilots tried to make it back to Jeddah, but the fire intensified and made its way to the cabin area causing passengers to panic. The flames engulfed the plane while it was still in mid-air and crashed, killing everyone on board.

Singapore 
 1954 BOAC Lockheed Constellation crash – The Lockheed Constellation was landing in Singapore-Kallang Airport when it struck a seawall and burst into flames in the deadliest aviation accident in Singapore.
 Singapore Airlines Flight 117 – Hijacked en route from Kuala Lumpur to Singapore.
 Qantas Flight 32 – an Airbus A380 from London to Sydney with a fuel stopover in Singapore suffered a catastrophic engine failure over Indonesia. The engine exploded and parts of it strewn over the Indonesian Island of Batam. Qantas Flight 32 was forced to make an emergency landing at Singapore Changi Airport. Everyone on board survived.
Singapore Airlines Flight 368- International flight from Singapore Changi Airport to Milan Malpensa Airport turns back after engine oil warning. The right-wing catches fire after landing. No injuries reported.

South Korea 
 Asiana Airlines Flight 733 was on approach to Mokpo Airport in VOR when suddenly it hit a ridge, killing 68 people on board. Pilot error was blamed for the accident, as the pilots started a descent while passing over the mountain peak.
 Air China Flight 129 was on approach to Gimhae International Airport, lining up, but then crashed into a mountain nearby killing 129 people on board out of 166 people. The pilot was not aware of their proximity to the ground due to bad weather condition until it was too late to recover.
 Korean Air Lines Flight 015 was on approach to Gimpo International Airport when the pilots reported some problem with the controls. It hit an embankment slope, slid down, and caught fire, killing 15 people.

Sri Lanka 
 Air Lanka Flight 512, the Lockheed L-1011-100 TriStar 100 was taxiing for take-off to Malé when a time bomb exploded and ripped the cabin, split it into two. 21 people were killed. The bomb was intended to explode in mid-flight, but a delay actually saved the aircraft from total destruction that might have killed all 148 people on board.
 Icelandic Airlines Flight 001, a Douglas DC-8 on a charter flight, crashed into a coconut plantation while on approach to Katunayake, Sri Lanka for a refueling stop. 78 survived, but 184 were killed.
 Martinair Flight 138 was a McDonnell Douglas DC-8 operating on behalf of Indonesia's flag carrier Garuda Indonesia carrying hajj pilgrimage to Mecca in which on 4 December 1974, the plane flew into a mountain, killing all 191 people on board. To date, it remains the deadliest air disaster in Sri Lankan aviation history.

Syria 
 ČSA Flight 540 – On 20 August 1975, an Ilyushin Il-62 operated by Czechoslovak national airline Czechoslovak Airlines flying to Tehran was stopping in approach to Damascus International Airport in clear weather condition when it crashed and burst into flames, 17 km from the airport. Only two people survived. An investigation concluded that CFIT was the cause of the deadliest plane crash in Syria's aviation history.

Taiwan

 China Airlines Flight 206 – The NAMC YS-11 crashed into a bamboo grove near the top of Yuan Mountain after entered inclement weather condition, killing 14 people.
 Formosa Airlines Flight 7623 - Crashed into the sea shortly after take-off after an electrical failure. All 13 on board die.
China Airlines Flight 676 – Crashed into a road upon approach to the airport, killing all passengers and crew of the aircraft and six persons on the ground.
Far Eastern Air Transport Flight 103 – Shortly after takeoff, the Boeing 737 disintegrated and broke apart in mid-air, killing all 110 people on board. Severe corrosion led to the aircraft's destruction.
 Singapore Airlines Flight 006 – Singapore Airlines Boeing 747 was starting to take off when it hit a ground maintenance vehicle at Chiang Kai-shek International Airport near Taipei, Taiwan. 83 people died as the result. The plane was taking off from the wrong runway which was closed for maintenance.
 TransAsia Airways Flight 222 was attempting to land in Huxi, Taiwan while in bad weather condition when it crashed into several houses. There were 58 people aboard the ATR 72-500; only 10 survived. The crash injured 5 people on the ground. An investigation concluded that the cause was pilot error.

 TransAsia Airways Flight 235 was flying over Taipei when one of its engines failed. The ATR 72 then rolled sharply to the left, clipped a taxi, and Huandong Viaduct. It impacted Keelung River in an upside-down condition. 43 people out of 58 people were killed. The investigation is still ongoing. Moments the plane crashed was captured by a motorist and CCTV.

Tajikistan
 1993 Tajik Air Yakovlev Yak-40 incident – On 28 August 1993, A Yakovlev Yak-40 operated by Tajik Air crashed shortly after takeoff from Khorog Airport, hit a boulder and plunged into the Panj River, killing 82 people in the deadliest plane crash in Tajikistan. Overloading was blamed for the crash.

Thailand 
 Bangkok Airways Flight 266 – 4 August 2009 – The ATR 72 Overran the runway on landing and crashed into a disused control tower at Koh Samui Airport. The pilot of the plane was the only person killed in the incident.
 EgyptAir Flight 864 – 25 December 1976 – Flight 864 was on final approach to Bangkok's Don Mueang International Airport when it rolled and crashed into an industrial complex in Bangkok, killing all 52 people on board. 19 people on the ground were also killed. The investigators concluded that the cause was pilot error.
 Lauda Air Flight 004 – 26 May 1991 – Flight 004 was flying over Phu Toei National Park when it suddenly broke up in mid-flight, aircraft wreckage littered the area and strewn into the jungle near Suphan Buri and Ban Nong Rong, killing everyone on board in Thailand's worst aviation disaster. The cause of the breakup was because of an uncommanded thrust reverser on engine no. 1 causing the Boeing 767-3Z9ER to lose control and broke up. Flight 004 was famously known due to Niki Lauda's own contribution to the investigation of the crash.
 One-Two-GO Airlines Flight 269 – 16 September 2007 – A McDonnell Douglas MD-82 attempted to land in wind shear and strong winds at Phuket International Airport. The plane failed to land, rise sharply over the runway, stalled, crashed, and burst into flames in the side of the runway. Pilot error was blamed for the accident that killed 90 people.

 Thai Airways Flight 231 -	27 April 1980 – Flight 231 was on approach to Bangkok when it entered a thunderstorm. A downdraft struck the plane, causing it to stall. It then dived and crashed into the ground, killing 44 people out of 53 people on board.
 Thai Airways Flight 365 – 31 August 1987 – crashed off Ko Phuket due to pilot error, killing all 83 on board.
 Thai Airways International Flight 114 – 3 March 2001 – exploded while parked at Don Mueang Airport, killing one (a flight attendant) of eight on board; an assassination attempt was also theorized as traces of explosives were found in the wreckage.
 Thai Airways International Flight 261 – 11 December 1998 – Flight crews made a third attempt to land the plane after the second failed attempt when the plane stalled with a high angle of attack and crashed into a paddy field on approach to Surat Thani Airport amid heavy rains and poor visibility. 101 people were killed while 45 others survived.
 Vietnam Airlines Flight 831 – 9 September 1988 – crashed into a rice field near Semafahkarm Village, Tambon Khu Khot. 76 people were killed.

United Arab Emirates 

 Gulf Air Flight 771 – Bombed, then crashed into a desert in the United Arab Emirates.
 Kish Air Flight 7170 – The aircraft was due to land from Kish Island in Iran to Sharjah Airport when it spiraled and crashed, killing 43 people on board. The pilot accidentally selected the propellers into reverse thrust in mid-air causing it to spiral down out of control.
 Sterling Airways Flight 296 – A Sud Aviation Caravelle operated by Sterling Airways carrying 112 people crashed into a mountain ridge near Kalba, killing all of them. Investigators concluded that an outdated flight plan and/or due to misreading of weather radar was the cause of the crash. 
 Tajikistan Airlines Flight 3183 the Tupolev Tu-154 was carrying 86 people to Sharjah airport. The Tupolev Tu-154 crashed, disintegrated into the desert, leaving the flight navigator the only survivor in the third deadliest plane crash in the United Arab Emirates.
 On December 27, 1997, a Pakistan Airlines Boeing 747 plane from Karachi to London, crashed when landing at Dubai international airport. It overshot the runway and went through the perimeter wall before coming to rest. No one was killed. 
 In 2010, UPS Airlines Flight 6 took off from Dubai airport but caught fire and then crashed next to a major road.
 Emirates Flight 521 – Boeing 777-31H – Reg A6-EMW – Flight from Thiruvananthapuram, South India, crash-landed during a routine approach to runway 12L at Dubai International Airport on 3 August 2016 at around 08:37z. The accident currently under investigation, but an incident during the final / go around, caused the plane to crash land onto 12L, skid the length of the runway, and finally came to rest pointing WSW between runway entry points Mike-13 and Mike-13A, close to the end of RWY 12L / THR 30R. The plane suffered a fire which led to an explosion of the right-wing, which caused irreparable damage to the hull. All passengers and crew were evacuated, but one airport firefighter was killed during the incident.

Uzbekistan 
 Aeroflot Flight 7425 (10 July 1985) – While cruising at an altitude of 38,100 ft, the Tupolev Tu-154 entered a flat spin. The crews were not able to recover it and the plane crashed near Uchuduk. All 200 people on board the aircraft perished in the deadliest plane crash in Uzbekistan as well as the deadliest plane crash involving a Tupolev Tu-154.
 Aeroflot Flight 505 – Shortly after take-off from Tashkent, the Yakovlev Yak-40 banked sharply to the right and crashed, killing all 9 people on board. The plane encountered a wake vortex formed by an Ilyushin Il-76 that had taken off minutes before Flight 505.
 Uzbekistan Airways Flight 1154 – During a foggy night at Tashkent International Airport, the Yakovlev Yak-40 overran the runway, clipped a ground structure, and somersaulted. The aircraft then exploded and burst into flames, killing everyone aboard.

Vietnam 
 Cathay Pacific Flight 700Z bombing – While flying at 29.000 ft, a suitcase bomb exploded. The aircraft disintegrated. All 80 people on board were killed. 
 Air Vietnam Flight 706 hijacking – Hijacked, then crashed after a missed approach at Phan Rang.
 Vietnam Airlines Flight 474 – The Yakovlev Yak-40 was carrying 31 people when it crashed into terrain near Son Trung during Cyclone Forrest. Only one person survived, Dutch nationality Annette Herfkens, who survived by herself eight days in the forest, only with rainwater. An investigation blamed Controlled Flight Into Terrain for the crash.

Yemen
 EgyptAir Flight 763 – On 19 March 1972, while approaching Aden International Airport, the aircraft smashed into the Shamsans Mountain, killing all 30 people on board.

South China Sea 
 Qantas Flight 30 – 25 July 2008, Mid-air decompression after departure from Hong Kong, landed safely in Manila; no injuries.

Various countries
 Indian Airlines Flight 814 – Hijacked on the way to India, and flown to India, Pakistan, the UAE, and Afghanistan before the passengers were released; 1 passenger was killed by the hijackers.

Central America and the Caribbean



Bermuda
 1952 Bermuda air crash – On 6 December 1952, a Cubana de Aviación Douglas DC-4 stalled and impacted tail first with the sea. 37 people were killed. 4 people survived the fall.

Barbados
 Cubana de Aviación Flight 455 – On October 6, 1976, eleven minutes after takeoff, two bombs exploded and ripped the DC-8 to pieces. The aircraft pieces fell to the water, all 73 people on board were killed. Cuba blamed The US and CIA for the bombing.

Costa Rica
On January 15, 1990, SANSA Flight 32 crashed into a mountain in Costa Rica after takeoff from Juan Santamaría International Airport in San José, killing all 23 on board.

Cuba
 Aeroflot Flight 331 – On 27 May 1977, an Aeroflot Ilyushin Il-62 was on approach to José Martí International Airport when it clipped power lines and crashed into the ground, only 2 people survived. Pilot error was blamed for the crash.
 Cubana de Aviación Flight 9046 – On 3 September 1989, a Cubana de Aviación Ilyushin Il-62M crashed shortly after takeoff from José Martí International Airport in bad weather. The aircraft crashed into a residential area. 126 people on board and 45 people on the ground, were killed.
 Aero Caribbean Flight 883 – On 4 November 2010, an ATR-72 operated by Cuba national airlines Cubana stalled and crashed in the Cuban provinces of Sancti Spiritus. All 68 people on board were killed. Until now, the investigation is still open.
 Cubana de Aviación Flight 972 – On 18 May 2018, a Boeing 737-201 Advanced was carrying 113 passengers and crews. While taking off from Havana's José Martí International Airport, the plane suddenly banked to the left, stalled, and nose-dived. It then crashed onto a railway and exploded, killing 110 people. 2 survivors later succumbed to their injuries.

Dominican Republic
Dominicana DC-9 air disaster The Dominicana de Aviación Santo Domingo DC-9 air disaster occurred on February 15, 1970, when a Dominicana de Aviación (Dominican Airlines) McDonnell Douglas DC-9-32 twin-engine jet airliner crashed on takeoff from Santo Domingo, Dominican Republic en route to San Juan, Puerto Rico.

Birgenair Flight 301 was en route to Frankfurt, Germany via Gander, Canada, and Berlin, Germany. The pitot tube was blocked by a nest, causing a faulty reading on the airspeed. Pilot error caused the plane to stall and crash into the sea. Everyone on board was killed.

Guatemala
 The 1977 Aviateca Convair 240 crash occurred on April 27, 1977, when a Convair 240 suffered engine failure shortly after takeoff from La Aurora International Airport in Guatemala City, and crashed after attempting an emergency landing, killing all 28 on board.
 The 1986 Aerovías Guatemala air crash occurred on 18 January 1986 and involved a Sud Aviation SE-210 Caravelle III which crashed into a hill on approach to Santa Elena Airport, Flores after a short flight from Guatemala City's La Aurora International Airport. All 93 passengers and crew on board were killed, making it the worst air disaster in Guatemalan history.
 Cubana de Aviación Flight 1216 overran the runway of La Aurora International Airport on 21 December 1999, ran down a slope and crashed into a residential area of Guatemala City, killing 16 on board and 2 on the ground.

Haiti
 1995 Air St. Martin Beech 1900 crash – An Air Saint Martin Beechcraft 1900D crashed into a mountain after being cleared by air traffic controller to descent. The crash killed all 20 passengers and crews on board.
 Tropical Airways Flight 1301 – The Let L-410 Turbolet was taking off from Hugo Chávez International Airport when its cargo door suddenly flipped open in mid-flight. The crew attempted an emergency landing, however, the plane stalled and crashed into a sugar cane field, killing everyone on board.

Honduras

 Tan-Sahsa Flight 414 with 146 people on board crashed into a hill on approach to Toncontín International Airport in Tegucigalpa on October 21, 1989. 131 people died in the crash, making it the worst air crash in Central American history.
 Central American Airways Flight 731 crashed on February 14, 2011, on approach to Toncontín International Airport, killing all 14 on board.
 TACA Flight 390 overran the runway of Toncontín International Airport on May 30, 2008, and crashed into an embankment, smashing several cars and killing 5.

Jamaica
 American Airlines Flight 331 the Boeing 737-823 was landing on Kingston's Norman Manley International Airport when it overran the runway, flew into the rocky beach, crashed, and broke apart. 85 people were injured. However, no one was killed.
 Avianca Flight 671 a Lockheed L-1049E Super Constellation was landing on Montego Bay's Sangster International Airport. The plane touched the runway hard enough to bounced it back to the air. It touched the runway again and skidded. The plane then burst into flames. 37 people were killed.

Panama
 Alas Chiricanas Flight 901 – In-flight explosion caused by a bomb.
 Copa Airlines Flight 201 – On the night of 6 June 1992, while traveling above the Darién Gap, the Boeing 737 rolled to the right, turned over, and suddenly disintegrate in mid-air. It then exploded and crashed into the dense Panamanian forest, killing all 47 people on board.

Puerto Rico
 Prinair Flight 277 - Crashed into a mountain in Fajardo, killing 19. 
 Prinair Flight 191 – Crashed while landing at Mercedita Airport. Ponce, killing 5.
 Air Caribbean Flight 309 - Crashed into a bar while landing at Isla Verde International Airport in San Juan, killing 6.
 Vieques Air Link Flight 901A – Crashed after take-off from Vieques Airport, killing 8.

Europe


Albania
Turkish Airlines Flight 1476 from Tirana to Istanbul was hijacked en route to Italy.

Austria
 British Eagle International Airlines Flight 802 crashed into the Glungezer mountain near Innsbruck on 29 February 1964, killing all 83 people on board. 
 Hapag-Lloyd Flight 3378 crash-landed 650 m short of the runway in Vienna on 12 July 2000 due to fuel exhaustion 22 km out, arising from erroneous fuel management combined with a failure to divert. There were no serious injuries.

Belarus
 Aeroflot Flight 8641, the Yakovlev Yak-42 suffered a jackscrew failure, causing the aircraft to lose control, disintegrate in mid-air, and crashed near Mozyr. All 132 people on board were killed.
 Aeroflot Flight 7841 – On 1 February 1985, shortly after taking off, Flight 7481 suffered double engine failure due to ice ingestion. To maintain speed, the captain descended onto a forest. The plane clipped some trees, crashed, and burned all the way down, killing 58 people.

Belgium
 March 28, 1933 - An Imperial Airways Argosy crashes near Diksmuide following an onboard fire suspected to be the first case of aerial sabotage. All 12 passengers and 3 crew were killed.
 30 December 1933 - An Avro Ten operated by Imperial Airways crashes on a radio mast of Belradio at Ruysselede killing all 8 passengers and 2 crew. 
 16 November 1937 - Sabena OO-AUB crashes while attempting to land in bad weather near Ostend. All 11 aboard are killed.
 15 February 1961 - Sabena Flight 548 crashed due to mechanical failure while attempting to land in Brussels. All 72 passengers and crew were killed, along with a single ground casualty.
 2 October 1971 - British European Airways Flight 706, a Vickers Vanguard operated by British European Airways, suffers a rear pressure bulkhead failure due to corrosion causing the tailplane to detach. It nose-dived into a farmland killing all 55 passengers and 8 crew and minorly injuring 1 person on the ground.
 May 25, 2008 - Kalitta Air Flight 207 suffers a bird strike on take-off from Brussels Airport and overruns the runway. Everyone survives.

Bulgaria
 On 27 July 1955, El Al Flight 402 was shot down by Bulgarian jets after it went astray onto Bulgarian airspace. Everyone on board Flight 402 was killed.
 A Balkan Bulgarian Airlines Tupolev Tu-134 crashed near the village of Gabare. All 73 on people on board died.
 A Balkan Bulgarian Airlines Tupolev Tu-134 crashed on approach to Sofia Airport. All 50 people on board died.
 Hemus Air Flight 7081, a Tupolev Tu-154 operated by Hemus Air was hijacked on 3 September 1996. The plane lands safely without injuries.

Croatia
 British Airways Flight 476 collided with Inex-Adria Aviopromet Flight 550 in mid-air near Zagreb, killing all 176 people on board both aircraft and another on the ground.
 Aviogenex Flight 130, as the aircraft was approaching Rijeka Airport, the aircraft then entered into a gradually steeping angle of descent. Due to an optical illusion, the crew thought they were closer to the runway and at a greater altitude than the actual one. The plane then crashed and turned over. The ensuing fire kills 78 people on board.

Cyprus
 1967 Nicosia Britannia disaster – On 20 April 1967, a Globe Air charter flight, operated with a Bristol Britannia 313 flew into high ground near Nicosia, Cyprus. Only 4 people survived.
 EgyptAir Flight 741, an Ilyushin Il-18D operated by Egyptair crashes into the Kyrenia Mountains on approach on 29 January 1971. All 30 passengers and 7 crew died. 
 Talia Airways Flight 2H79, a Boeing 727-200 crashed into a mountain, killing all 15 occupants.
 EgyptAir Flight 181, an Airbus A320-233 operated by EgyptAir is hijacked on 29 March 2016. The plane lands safely without injuries.

Czechoslovakia

 Aeroflot Flight 141 (1973) the Tupolev Tu-154 impacted ground and burst into flames while on approach to Prague Ruzyně Airport. 66 people were burned to death.

 JAT Flight 367, bombed, then crashed in Srbská Kamenice, Czechoslovakia. Only one person survived the crash.
 Inex-Adria Aviopromet Flight 450, ground impact during final approach in foggy weather Prague, 1975, Czechoslovakia.

Denmark
 26 January 1947 - Douglas Dakota, PH-TCR of KLM crashed after takeoff from Kastrup airport in Copenhagen, killing all 22 on board, including Prince Gustaf Adolf of Sweden.
 16 July 1960 - A de Havilland Dragon Rapide operated by Zonens Redningskorps loses control and crashes 50 meters from the shore killing all 8 passengers. Only the pilot survived. 
 28 August 1971 - Malév Flight 731 crashes into the Baltic Sea on approach to Copenhagen Airport killing 31.
 8 September 1989 - Partnair Flight 394 suffers a rudder hardover due to counterfeit parts and breaks up over the sea, killing all 55 on board. 
 9 September 2007 - Scandinavian Airlines Flight 1209, a Bombardier Dash 8 Q400 operated Scandinavian Airlines suffers a right gear collapse on landing at Aalborg Airport. 5 people are injured. 
 27 October 2007 - Scandinavian Airlines Flight 2867, a Bombardier Dash 8 Q400 operated by Scandinavian Airlines suffers a right gear collapse on landing at Copenhagen Airport. There are no injuries.

Finland
 Aero Flight 1631 (14 June 1940) – A Junkers Ju 52 operated by Aero O/Y is shot down by two Soviet Ilyushin DB-3 bombers. All 7 passengers and 2 crew are killed. 
 Aero Flight 311 (3 January 1961) – The plane, a Douglas DC-3, entered a spin during approach and crashed into the woods, killing all 25 people on board.
 Aero Flight 217 (8 November 1963) – A Douglas DC-3 crashed into the ground while trying to land at Mariehamn Airport. The plane came to rest upside down and caught fire, killing 22 people.

France
 7 April 1922 - A Farman F.60 Goliath operated by Compagnie des Grands Express Aériens collides with a de Havilland DH.18A operated by Daimler Hire Limited. All 3 passengers and 2 crew on the Goliath and 2 crew on the DH.18A die. 
 14 May 1923 - A Farman F.60 Goliath operated by Air Union broke up killing all 4 passengers and 2 crew. 
 1 June 1943 - BOAC Flight 777-A, a Douglas DC-3-194 operated by British Overseas Airways Corporation is shot down by 8 Junkers Ju 88 fighters. All 13 passengers and 4 crew died. 
 18 December 1949 - A Douglas DC-3 operated by Sabena crashes after suffering a structural failure of a wing, killing all 8 on board.
 3 November 1950 - Air India Flight 245 crashes into Mont Blanc killing all 48 on board.
 13 November 1950 - A Douglas C-54 operated by Curtiss-Reid Flying Service crashes into a mountain killing all 58 on board.
 3 November 1950 - Air India Flight 245, a Lockheed L-749A Constellation operated by Air India crashes in Mont Blanc. All 40 passengers and 8 crew die. 
 3 March 1952 - A SNCASE SE.161 Languedoc operated by Air France loses control and crashes due to jammed ailerons. All 34 passengers and 4 crew died. 
 1 September 1953 - Air France Flight 178, a Lockheed L-749 Constellation crashes in the French Alps killing all 42 on board.
 24 September 1959 - TAI Flight 307, a Douglas DC-7C operated by Transports Aériens Intercontinentaux crashes in a pine forest. Of the 56 passengers and 9 crew, only 11 survive with serious injuries. 
 7 October 1961 - A Derby Aviation C-47 crashes into Canigou mountainside en route to Perpignan, killing all 34 aboard.
 3 June 1962 - Air France Flight 007, a chartered Boeing 707 crashes on takeoff from Orly due to a mechanical failure. 130 people die.
 22 June 1962 - Air France Flight 117 crashes into a hill and explodes killing all 113 on board.
 24 January 1966 - Air India Flight 101, a Boeing 707-437 operated by Air India hits Mont Blanc. All 106 passengers and 11 crew die. 
 3 June 1967 - A Douglas DC-4 operated by Air Ferry crashes into Mount Canigou after the crew becomes poisoned with carbon monoxide. All 88 on board die.
 October 27, 1972 - Air Inter Flight 696Y crashes in the La Faye Forest killing 60.
 5 March 1973 - Iberia Flight 504, a McDonnell Douglas DC-9-32 operated by Iberia and Spantax Flight 400, a Convair 990 Coronado operated by Spantax collide due to ATC error. All 61 passengers and 7 crew on the DC-9 die while the Convair 990 lands safely without fatalities. 
 3 June 1973 - A Tupolev Tu-144 breaks up during the Paris Air Show, killing all 6 crew and 8 people on the ground.
 11 July 1973 - Varig Flight 820 lands in a field near Orly, France, because of a lavatory fire killing 123.
 3 March 1974 - Turkish Airlines Flight 981 was a DC-10 flying from Paris Charles de Gaulle International Airport. Just after take-off, the cargo door suddenly torn apart from the aircraft. The explosive decompression cut most of the aircraft's vital cables, thus, a crash was inevitable. It then crashed in Ermenonville Forest.  All 346 people on board perished. It remains the deadliest accident in France and the second-worst single-plane crash with no survivors.
 1 December 1981 - Inex-Adria Aviopromet Flight 1308 crashes into Corsica's Mont San-Pietro, killing all 180 people on board.
 4 March 1988 - TAT Flight 230, a Fairchild FH-227 operated by TAT European Airlines suffers an electrical malfunction and crashes. All 20 passengers and 3 crew died. 
 26 June 1988 - Air France Flight 296 crashes into a forest during a low-pass killing 3. It is the first Airbus A320 crash.
 20 January 1992 - Air Inter Flight 148, an Airbus A320, crashed near Mont Sainte-Odile while it was circling to land at Strasbourg, killing 87.
 31 March 1992 - Trans-Air Service Flight 671 suffers a double engine separation. A fire subsequently erupts on the wing. It lands at Istres-Le Tubé Air Base.
 6 January 1993 - Lufthansa CityLine Flight 5634 was initiating a go-around when the plane suddenly entered a high sink rate. The aircraft crashed and split into two parts, killing 4 people.
 30 June 1994 - Airbus Industrie Flight 129, an Airbus A330-321 operated by Airbus Industrie crashed during a test flight due to pilot error. All 4 passengers and 3 crew are killed. 
 24–26 December 1994 - Air France Flight 8969 is hijacked after takeoff from Algiers and taken back to France. 7 people are killed.
 30 July 1998 - Proteus Airlines Flight 706, a Beechcraft 1900D operated by Proteus Airlines collides with a private Cessna 177RG Cardinal. All 12 passengers and 2 crew on the Beechcraft and the only pilot on the Cessna died. 
 25 July 2000 - Air France Flight 4590, a Concorde, was on its take-off roll when it ran over a metal strip left by a Continental Airlines DC-10. One of its tires burst and its pieces hit the fuel tank and ignited a fire. The Concorde stalled and crashed on a hotel in Gonesse, France. All 109 on board and 4 people in the hotel are killed.
 22 June 2003 - Air France Flight 5672, a Bombardier CRJ100ER operated by Brit Air for Air France crashes on approach. Of the 21 passengers and 3 crew, the pilot dies and 9 people are injured (5 seriously). 
 27 November 2008 - XL Airways Germany Flight 888T, an Airbus A320-232 operated by XL Airways Germany stalls and crashes due to sensor malfunction. All 5 passengers and 2 crew died. 

 24 March 2015 - Germanwings Flight 9525 crashes near Digne-les-Bains in the French Alps en route to Düsseldorf Airport after the co-pilot locked the captain from the cockpit and deliberately crashed the plane into the Alps, killing all 150 people on board.

Germany

 1934 Swissair Tuttlingen accident, the wing of Curtiss AT-32C Condor II separated from the airplane while in adverse weather conditions. All 12 people on board were killed. 
 On 8 November 1940, a Junkers Ju 90A-1 operated by Deutsche Luft Hansa lost control and crashed due to tail icing. All 23 passengers and 6 crew die. 
 British European Flight 609, crashed in Munich, West Germany (Munich air disaster)
 ČSA Flight 511 was cruising above Germany when it disintegrated into pieces. The plane's wreckage fell from the sky and struck the ground below, killing all 52 people on board.
 Paninternational Flight 112, due to the mistakes of ground crews, the aircraft suffered a dual engine failure. The aircraft then attempted an emergency landing on Bundesautobahn 7, but then collided with a bridge and burst into flames, killing 22 people on board.
 Lufthansa Flight 005 stalled and crashed during a go-around, killing all 46 people on board, including seven Italian team swimmers of the Olympic team.
 Pan Am Flight 708, a Boeing 727-21 operated by Pan American World Airways crashes on approach on 15 November 1966. All 3 crew members die. 
 1972 Königs Wusterhausen air disaster occurred when an Interflug's Ilyushin Il-62 suffered an in-flight fire. The pilots then made their way back to Berlin. The pilots then tried to see the airport. When the pilot had the airport already insight and was just a few kilometers south of it, the tail section broke off. The plane entered an uncontrollable descent. The front part of the plane detached, and the plane disintegrated gradually in the sky while its airframe engulfed in flames. Later crashed into a forest, killing all on board in Germany's worst plane crash. 
 Interflug Flight 1107 was on approach to Leipzig/Halle Airport when it struck a radio mast and crashed, killing 27 people.
 12 December 1986 - Aeroflot Flight 892 was on approach to Schonefeld Airport. Due to a language misunderstanding, the Tu-134A landed on a closed runway. It took off again, but then stalled and burst into flames. 72 people died.
 Nürnberger Flugdienst Flight 108 struck by lightning and lost control. The aircraft crashed and exploded, killing everyone on board.
 Überlingen mid-air collision occurred when a Tupolev Tu-154 carrying 69 people, 45 of whom were children, collided with a DHL Boeing 757 over the city of Überlingen on 1 July 2002. All 71 people on board both aircraft killed.
 Swiss International Air Lines Flight 850, a Saab 2000 operated by Swiss International Air Lines hits an earth embankment on landing. Of the 16 passengers and 4 crew, 1 passenger suffers minor injuries. 
 19 June 2010 - A Douglas C-47 Skytrain operated by Air Service Berlin crashed in a field due to a left engine failure. Of the 25 passengers and 3 crew, 7 people were injured

Greece
 Cyprus Airways Flight 284 (October 12, 1967) - A de Havilland DH.106 Comet 4B operated by Cyprus Airways (on behalf of British European Airways) broke up in mid-air due to an explosive device. All 66 on board died. 
 Olympic Airways Flight 954 (December 8, 1969) – A Douglas DC-6 (SX-DAE) crashed during its approach to Athens Hellenicon Airport from Chania on Paneio mountain near Keratea amidst bad weather killing 90 passengers and crew. This was the worst aircraft accident in Greece until 2005.
 TWA Flight 841 (September 8, 1974) – A Boeing 707-331B (N8734) crashed in the Ionian sea 30 minutes after its departure from Athens. An explosive device in the luggage area destroyed flight controls and resulted in 88 fatalities.
 Olympic Airways Flight 830 (November 23, 1976) - A NAMC YS-11A operated by Olympic Airways hit a mountain near the village of Servia. All 50 on board died. 
 Swissair Flight 316 (October 8, 1979) – A Douglas DC-8 (HB-IDE) landed near the middle of runway 15L of Athens Hellenicon Airport at more than 270 km/h overrun the runway and stopped on a public road outside the airport area. Its left-wing was severed from the fuselage and in the resulting fire 14 out of 154 passengers died.
 TWA Flight 847 (June 14, 1985) - A Boeing 727-231 operated by Trans World Airlines was hijacked. 1 passenger dies. 
 TWA Flight 840 (April 2, 1986) – Bombed on the way to Athens, Greece, sucking out 4 on board – the plane landed safely.
 Olympic Aviation Flight 545 (August 3, 1989) – A Shorts 330-200 (SX-BGE) crashed on Kerkis mountain coming from Thessaloniki towards airport Pythagoras in Samos. All 31 passengers and crew of 3 died.
 Aerosvit Flight 241 (December 17, 1997) - A Yakovlev Yak-42 operated by Aerosvit Airlines crashes in Pieria Mountains due to pilot error. All 70 people die. 
 Malév Flight 262 (July 4, 2000) – On the first attempt of the landing, the aircraft performed a belly landing and skidded with the runway, causing significant damage. The aircraft initiated a go-around and landed safely.
 Helios Airways Flight 522 ("Ghost Plane Incident")— The Cypriot Boeing 737 was on its way to Athens when the crews reported an air conditioner problem, which was actually a pressure problem. The plane increases the altitude, lowering the pressure, and decreasing the oxygen level. All of the passengers and crews but one suffered hypoxia. The plane was flying without any communication with the tower. It then ran out of fuel and crashed near Grammatiko. All 121 people on board were killed.
 Turkish Airlines Flight 1476 (October 3, 2006) - A Boeing 737-4Y0 operated by Turkish Airlines is hijacked. Everyone survives without injuries.

Ireland
 TWA Flight 6963 (December 28, 1946) - A Lockheed L-049 Constellation operated by Trans World Airlines crashed short of the runway. 9 people died while 14 people survived. 
 Pan Am Flight 1-10 (April 15, 1948) - A Lockheed L-049-51-26 Constellation operated by Pan American World Airways crashed short of the runway. 30 people died and 1 person survived. 
 KLM Flight 633 – Ditched after takeoff from Shannon Airport on 5 September 1954.
 Pan Am Clipper Panama (June 22, 1959) - A Douglas DC-6B operated by Pan American World Airways suffers engine no.4 fire. All 8 people on board survived but 6 dogs died. 
 1961 President Airlines Douglas DC-6 crash – banked to the left and crashed into Shannon River shortly after takeoff, killing all 83 people on board. 
 Aer Lingus Flight 712 – Crashed into the sea off County Wexford in 1968, killing 61. Cause unknown.
 American Airlines Flight 293 (June 20, 1979) - A Boeing 727 operated by American Airlines is hijacked. The hijacker later received a Boeing 707. No one is injured.

Italy
 1919 Verona Caproni Ca.48 crash – Caproni Ca.48 crashed at Verona, Italy (2 August 1919), killing all on board (14, 15, or 17 people).
 BOAC Flight 781 – On 10 January 1954, British Overseas Airways Corporation Flight 781, a de Havilland DH.106 Comet 1, suffered an explosive decompression at altitude and crashed near Elba into the Mediterranean Sea, killing all 35 on board.
 South African Airways Flight 201 – On 8 April 1954, a de Havilland Comet 1, en route to Cairo, Egypt, suffered an explosive decompression at altitude and crashed south of Naples killing all 21 aboard.
 Sabena Flight 503 – The Douglas DC-6 crashed into Monte Terminillo near Rieti while flying in heavy snow and rain condition. All aboard were killed in the accident.
 British European Airways Flight 142 – The Vickers Viscount 701 collided with an Italian Air Force North American F-86E Sabre over Anzio. The passenger plane disintegrated, killing all 31 people on board. The person on the F-86 Sabre survived.
 Alitalia Flight 4128 – The DC-9 was approaching Palermo Airport when the aircraft crashed into the sea and sank, killing 108 people on board. The crew deliberately made a premature descent as they thought that they were nearer to the airport than they were.
 Itavia Flight 870 – Crashed into the Tyrrhenian Sea near Ustica island en route to Palermo. The cause of the crash remains unclear; the most likely hypotheses are a bomb on board or an accidental shootdown by an anti-aircraft missile.
 Aero Trasporti Italiani Flight 460 – The ATR-42 rolled to the right and left several times and then dived into a mountain, eventually crashed, killing all 37 people on board.
 Uganda Airlines Flight 775 – Clipped some trees, crashed, and burst onto flames while on approach to Roma-Fiumicino Airport on 17 October 1988.

 Banat Air Flight 166 – An Antonov An-24 was taking off from Verona while carrying 49 passengers and crews on board. Due to ice accumulation on its wing, the aircraft lost its altitude and crashed, killing all aboard.
 Scandinavian Airlines Flight 686 – On 8 October 2001, in Milan, a Scandinavian Airlines McDonnell Douglas MD-87 was taking off from Milan when a small business jet suddenly entered the runway. The MD-87 crashed into the jet and started to skid. It then swayed several times, went out of control, and crashed into the airport's hangar, killing all aboard. (Linate Airport disaster).

Kosovo
 Si Fly Flight 3275 – On 12 November 1999, Si Fly Flight 3275, an UN-chartered ATR 42 crashed into the mountaintop in Slakovce, Mitrovica, Kosovo.

Latvia
 December 30, 1967 - Aeroflot Flight L-51 losses control and crashes on approach killing 43.
 March 22, 1979 - An Aeroflot/Latvia Tupolev Tu-134A crashes on approach killing 4.

Luxembourg
 Aeroflot Flight 343 (September 29, 1982) - An Ilyushin Il-62M operated by Aeroflot veers off the runway on landing due to a mechanical failure killing 7 and injuring 70.
 Luxair Flight 9642 crashes on final approach to Luxembourg, killing 22.
 Cargolux Flight 7933 (January 21, 2010) - A Boeing 747-4R7F operated by Cargolux lands on a vehicle on the runway. 1 person in the vehicle was injured.

North-Macedonia
 Avioimpex Flight 110 – Flight 110 flew into a snowstorm and turned into a mountain. The Yakovlev Yak-42 impacted terrain and exploded, killing all 116 on board.
 Palair Macedonian Airlines Flight 301 – Shortly after takeoff, the aircraft shook violently. It banked to the right and to the left and crashed, killing 83 people. An ice accumulation had occurred in flight.

Malta
 1956 Scottish Airlines Malta air disaster – On 18 February 1956,  a Scottish Airlines Avro York was taking off from RAF Luqa when the boost enrichment capsule in the carburetor of number one engine failed and the engine caught fire. The aircraft stalled and crashed, killing all 50 people aboard.
 KLM Flight 861 (November 25, 1973) - A Boeing 747-206B operated by KLM is hijacked. No one is injured. 
 EgyptAir Flight 648 – On 23 November 1985, Flight 648 was hijacked by terrorist organization Abu Nidal. A standoff occurred in Malta Luqa Airport until 24 November 1985. A failed raid later occurred in the standoff, resulting in multiple casualties.
 2016 Malta Fairchild Merlin crash (October 24, 2016) - A Fairchild SA227-AT Merlin IVC operated by CAE Aviation stalled and crashed after takeoff due to mechanical failure. All 5 on board died. 
Afriqiyah Airways Flight 209 – On December 23, 2016, an Airbus A320 was hijacked to Malta. No fatalities

Montenegro
 JAT Airways Flight 769, the Sud Aviation SE-210 Caravelle 6-N crashed into terrain while on final approach to Podgorica, killing 41. A suspected radar malfunction, accompanied by ATC error, was blamed for the accident

Netherlands
 1946 KLM Douglas DC-3 Amsterdam accident (November 24, 1946) - A Douglas C-47A Skytrain operated by KLM crashed on approach. All 26 on board died. 
 KLM Flight 608 (August 23, 1954) - A Douglas DC-6B operated by KLM crashed in the North Sea. All 21 on board died. 
 NLM CityHopper Flight 431 The Fokker F-28-4000 entered a tornado, and, due to the massive pressure drop inside the tornado, the aircraft began to shake violently. The starboard wing of the plane detached from the plane. The plane spun and crashed, killing all on board.
KLM Cityhopper Flight 433 The pilots mistakenly believed that the engine 2 of the plane was suffering a low oil pressure due to a faulty warning light. They shut down the no 2 engine and flew back to Amsterdam Schipol Airport. While on final approach, the captain decided to go around and gave a full-throttle, only in one engine. The other remained at idle. It then stalled and crashed, killing 3 out of 21.

 El Al Flight 1862 a Boeing 747 crashed into an apartment complex in Amsterdam after suffering engine detachment due to metal fatigue. The resultant crash killed 43 people, including all four crew members and 39 people on the ground. 
 Turkish Airlines Flight 1951 a Boeing 737-800 flying from Atatürk Airport in Istanbul to Schiphol Airport in Amsterdam crashed into a field during final approach. Of the 127 passengers and 7 crew on board 9 were killed, 85 were injured along with 26 severely.

Norway
 British European Airways Flight 530 (August 7, 1946) - A Douglas C-47A Skytrain operated by British European Airways crashes into Mistberget. 3 people die. 
 Kvitbjørn disaster (August 28, 1947) - A Shorts S.25 Sandringham 6 operated by Det Norske Luftfartsselskap hits a mountain. All 35 on board die. 
 Bukken Bruse disaster, a flying boat crashed upon landing in Trondheim, Norway. Nineteen were killed; Bertrand Russell was among the 24 survivors.
 Hurum air disaster (November 20, 1949) - A Douglas C-47A-25DK operated by Aero Holland hits a mountain on approach. 34 people die. 
 Braathens SAFE Flight 253 (November 7, 1956) - A de Havilland DH-114 Heron 2B operated by Braathens SAFE  hits Hummelfjell due to icing. 2 people die. 
 Braathens SAFE Flight 239, crashed in Asker upon landing at Fornebu airport, Oslo, Norway, killing 40 of 45 people on board. The aircraft was four nmi off course in bad weather conditions.
 1961 Holtaheia Vickers Viking crash, crashed into a mountain near Stavanger, killing all 39 people on board. All except two of the passengers were students aged 13–16 years old.
 Widerøe Flight 933, crashed into the Barents Sea near Mehamn, killing all 15 on board. This incident remains highly controversial in Norway.
 Widerøe Flight 710, crashed in heavy fog, killing all 36 passengers in the worst-ever Dash 7 accident.
 Atlantic Airways Flight 670, a BAe 146, slides off the runway at Stord, Norway, killing four of the 16 people on board.
 Widerøe Flight 744 (October 27, 1993) - A de Havilland Canada DHC-6-300 Twin Otter operated by Widerøe crashes on approach due to pilot error. 6 people die and 13 others are injured. 
Widerøe Flight 839, a Twin Otter crashed in the sea outside Værøy, killing all 5 persons on board.
Vnukovo Airlines Flight 2801, a Tupolev Tu-154 crashed into a mountain on Svalbard killing all 141 people on board. Deadliest aviation accident ever in Norway.

Poland

 1951 LOT Li-2 Tuszyn air disaster the Lisunov Li-2 suffered an engine failure in mid-air. The pilots lost control of the plane, hit a power line, crashed and burst into flames in Tuszyn. All 18 people aboard were killed.
 1962 LOT Vickers Viscount Warsaw crash, the plane was returning from Brussels, had a mid-way landing in Berlin from where it took off at 5:55 pm. While on approach on runway 33 in Warsaw at 7:30 pm the crew received landing clearance. 46 seconds later the plane crashed and burned 1335 meters from the threshold. All 33 people on board perished.

 LOT Polish Airlines Flight 165, crashed into a mountain near Zawoja.
 LOT Polish Airlines Flight 007, crashed near Okęcie Airport in Warsaw.
 LOT Polish Airlines Flight 5055, crashed in Kabacki Forest (Warsaw).
 LOT Flight 703, crash-landed at high speed, bounced back, crashed, and burst into flames near Białobrzegi.

 Lufthansa Flight 2904, during landing on Okęcie Airport in Warsaw, the aircraft overran the runway and, broke apart and burst into flames.
 LOT Polish Airlines Flight 16, a Boeing 767, crash lands after the landing gear failed to deploy at Warsaw Frederic Chopin Airport.

Portugal

 Air Transat Flight 236 ran out of fuel over the Atlantic Ocean and glided successfully to the Azores.
 Independent Air Flight 1851 crashed 8 February 1989 on approach to Santa Maria Airport in the Azores, due to pilot and air traffic control errors. All 144 on board died.
 Martinair Flight 495 crashed on landing at Faro Airport 21 December 1992 after flying through two microbursts. 56 people on board were killed.
 TAP Portugal Flight 425 overran the runway at Madeira Airport on 19 November 1977, killing 131 people on board.
 Viasa Flight 897 spiraled to the left and impacted the ocean on 30 May 1961, killing all 61 people on board.

Romania
 TAROM Flight 371 – Crashed near Baloteşti (on 31 March 1995) due to auto-throttle failure followed by the incapacitation of the captain, all 60 on board died.
 TAROM Flight 3107 – Veered off the runway in Otopeni (on 30 December 2007) after hitting a maintenance vehicle during takeoff run due to poor weather conditions.

Russia
 Austrian Airlines Flight 901 smashed to the ground near Trukovo short of the runway on 26 September 1960, killing 31 people.
 In 1971 January 22 Surgut Aeroflot Antonov An-12 crash, an Aeroflot Antonov An-12 crashed into the ground short of the runway of Surgut International Airport. All 14 on board perished. Icing was blamed for the crash. 
 In 1971 January 31 Surgut Aeroflot Antonov An-12 crash, an Aeroslot Antonov An-12 carrying 1 passengers and 6 crew members crashed short of the runway of Surgut International Airport. All 7 people aboard perished. Icing was blamed for the crash.
 Aeroflot Flight 217 crashed outside of Moscow on 13 October 1972 killing all 174 aboard, cause not known.
 Korean Air Lines Flight 902 was shot down by Soviet Union Air Defence after the flight violating the Soviet Union airspace. It then crashed and skidded along the frozen Korpiyarvi lake, killing 2 passengers out of 109 passengers and crews on board.
 Aeroflot Flight 1080, the flight was taking off from Yekaterinburg when all three engines of the Yakovlev Yak-40 suddenly malfunctioned. While the crew was attempting to turn the aircraft back to the airport, the aircraft crashed into terrain, killing all 38 people on board. Investigators blamed the crew, the ATC worker, the overloaded state of the aircraft, and the weather condition for the crash.
 Aeroflot Flight 3932, the pilots were preoccupied with spatial disorientation as the main artificial horizon and the compass system gave the wrong indication due to electrical failure. The Tupolev Tu-104 then crashed approximately five miles from Koltsovo Airport. All 108 people on board were killed.
 Aeroflot Flight 964, the pilots were preoccupied with spatial disorientation as the main artificial horizon and the compass system gave the wrong indication due to electrical failure. The Tupolev Tu-104 spun and crashed into a field 16 km north-west of Domodedovo Airport. All 122 people on board were killed.
 Aeroflot Flight 2003, shortly after takeoff, the Tupolev Tu-124V dived and crashed into a house, killing 62 people.
 1976 Anapa mid-air collision, an Aeroflot Antonov An-24 carrying 52 people collided in mid-air over Anapa, Krasnodar Krai with an Aeroflot Yakovlev Yak-40, which was carrying 18 people. The impact severed the tail on both planes. Both planes then broke up in mid-air and crashed into the Black Sea, killing 80 people.
 Aeroflot Flight 1691, the Tupolev Tu-104B was taking off when one of its fire alarm suddenly sounded. It was a false alarm. The crews did not know that it was a false alarm and attempted to return to the airport but failed. It crashed and flipped over, killing 58 people.
 Aeroflot Tu-104A crash, the Tu-104A was taking off from Pushkin Airport on 7 February 1981 when the cargo hold suddenly shifted. The plane banked to the right and crashed in upside-down condition, killing all 51 people on board. The uneven distribution of the passengers in their seats was also found and concluded as one of its primary factors of the cause of the accident.
 Aeroflot Flight 498, the Ilyushin Il-14 crashed into mountainous terrain near Ust-Barguzin on 14 June 1981, killing 48 people in the worst accident involving an Ilyushin Il-14.
 Aeroflot Flight 811, the Antonov An-24RV was taking off from Komsomolsk-on-Amur Airport on 24 August 1981 when a Tupolev Tu-16K collided with the aircraft. All but one on board were killed. The survivor, Larisa Savitskaya, was conscious during the fall and glided with the 4х3 m aircraft fragment she was in. She fell into a soft, swampy glade.
 Aeroflot Flight 3603, the Tu-154B-2 was on approach to Norilsk Airport on 16 November 1981 when it descended below the glide slope aggravated with an excessive vertical speed. It then crashed ahead of the runway, killing 99 people.
 Aeroflot Flight 411, crashed on takeoff from Sheremetyevo Airport on 6 July 1982.
 Aeroflot Flight 593, crashed into a hillside in Siberia on 23 March 1994.
 Aeroflot Flight 601, the Antonov An-24RV banked left excessively and crashed while on approach Leshukonskoye Airport on 24 December 1983, killing 44 people. 
 Aeroflot Flight 2808, a Tupolev Tu-134, crashed short of the runway en route to Ivanovo airport, killing all 84 people on board.
 Aeroflot Flight 3352 crashed into maintenance vehicles upon landing at Omsk Airport, killing 174 on the aircraft and four more in the vehicles (11 October 1984).
 Aeroflot Flight 3519, the Tupolev Tu-154B-2's engine no 3 caught fire on December 23, 1984. The crews attempted an emergency landing in Krasnoyarsk, banked to the right and crashed with only one survivor.
 Baikal Airlines Flight 130, crashed near the town of Mamony, Irkutsk after an apparent engine fire on 3 January 1994.
 a Cheremshanka Airlines flight, crashes near Vanavara after running out of fuel in bad weather, killing 28 passengers and crew on September 26, 1994.
 Siberia Airlines Flight 1047 and Volga-AviaExpress Flight 1303 exploded in the sky after suicide bombers detonated their bombs in mid-air, killing 90 people.
 Regional Airlines Flight 9288, an Antonov An-24RV crashed 5 kilometers (3.1 miles) from the runway while on approach to Varandey Airport in Nenetskiy Avtonomnyy Okrug on 16 March 2005, killing 28 of the 52 people aboard.
 S7 Airlines Flight 778 failed to brake on landing at Irkutsk and hit a concrete wall on 9 July 2006, the plane exploded on impact, burst into flames and leaving its tail as the only part that left intact, 125 people were killed.
 UTAir Flight 471 The Tupolev Tu-134 suffered a catastrophic structural failure after a hard landing in Samara. The aircraft broke apart and flipped over, killing 6 people. (27 March 2007)
 Aeroflot Flight 821 crashed on approach to Perm Airport en route from Moscow (on 14 September 2008). All 88 people on board were killed.

 2010 Polish Air Force Tu-154 crash, a Tupolev Tu-154 was trying to land in Smolensk Airport when the left wing hit a tree, and the aircraft inverted to the left, crashed and skidded in upside down condition in Smolensk, killing President of Poland Lech Kaczyński and all people aboard.
 Katekavia Flight 9357, on the night of 3 August 2010, the Antonov An-24 veered to the right from its landing course, crossed a river, impacted trees, crashed and burst into flames, killing 12 people. Russian investigators concluded that pilot error was the cause of the accident.

 Kolavia Flight 348, While taxiing for take-off from Surgut, the Tupolev Tu-154B-2 caught fire. Evacuation was immediately ordered by the captain. 43 people were injured, and 3 people were killed.

 RusAir Flight 9605, on 20 June 2011, the Tupolev Tu-134A-3 was on approach to Petrozavodsk when it went upside down and crashed into houses, killing 47 people including FIFA football referee Vladimir Pettay. Pilot error was the cause of the accident.
 Angara Airlines Flight 9007, on 11 July 2011, the Antonov An-24 en route from Surgut to Tomsk suffered an engine fire, forcing the pilots to ditch into the Ob River. Seven of the 37 people on board were killed. The aircraft was written off.
 In the 2011 Lokomotiv Yaroslavl plane crash, a Yak-Service Yakovlev Yak-42, was carrying a Russian professional ice hockey team when it failed its takeoff, hit a mast and crashed into the Volga River riverbank. Everyone except one were killed in the crash. Initially, one of the hockey team members, Alexander Galimov, survived the crash. He later died on September 12.
 UTAir Flight 120 on 2 April 2012, the ATR 72 suffered an atmospheric icing and stalled. The plane impacted terrain and burst into flames, leaving with only 10 survivors. 
 Petropavlovsk-Kamchatsky Air Flight 251 crashed while attempting to land at Palana Airport in Russia after descended below minima on approach, killing 10 people. Pilot error was the cause of the accident.
 Red Wings Airlines Flight 9268 failed to stop after landing at Vnukovo Airport and left the runway at high-speed, the aircraft hit the runway and broke up on impact killing five of the eight on board.  Dashcam video shown the moment the aircraft hit and debris littered the runway.
 Tatarstan Airlines Flight 363 the Boeing 737 suddenly nose dived and hit the tarmac at nearly the speed of sound during a failed approach to Kazan Airport on 17 November 2013, upon impact the plane was pulverized and exploded to pieces. All 50 people were killed. The accident was caught on CCTV.

 Flydubai Flight 981, the Boeing 737 crashed in southwestern Russia while attempting its second landing at Rostov-on-Don. All 55 passengers and seven crew on board were killed. The plane was pulverized.
 2016 Russian Defence Ministry Tupolev Tu-154 crash crashed into the Black Sea 1.5 kilometers from Sochi on 25 December 2016. All 92 on board were killed, including 64 members of the Alexandrov Ensemble choir.
 Aeroflot Flight 1492, a Sukhoi Superjet 100, caught fire during a 5 May 2019 emergency landing at Moscow's Sheremetyevo Airport, killing 41 and injuring 11.

Slovakia
 Ilyushin IL-18B of the Bulgarian carrier TABSO During a snowy night, the plane was on approach when it crashed in the foothills of Little Carpathians, near Bratislava on 24 November 1966. All aboard were killed.
 ČSA Flight 001 A multiple engine failure occurred on board the Ilyushin Il-18L. As the crew attempted a go-around, the plane's right bank increased due to asymmetric thrust. It eventually crashed into Zlaté piesky, killing 76 people.

Slovenia
 Britannia Airways Flight 105, Crashed into a forest near Ljubljana, 1 September 1966, killing 98 out of 110 passengers.

Spain

 KLM Flight 4805 and Pan Am Flight 1736 crashed during takeoff from Tenerife in the Canary Islands on 27 March 1977 in what has become known as the Tenerife airport disaster, the deadliest aviation accident in history. The ground collision was caused by a number of factors, including weather conditions, pilot error, and technical limitations. 583 people aboard both aircraft died. Survivors numbered 61 (54 passengers, 7 crew).
 Dan-Air Flight 1008 crashed into a mountain on Tenerife near Los Rodeos due to pilot error on 25 April 1980. All 146 people aboard were killed.

 Aviaco Flight 118, a Sud Aviation SE 210 Caravelle carrying 85 people crashed into a village near Montrove killing everyone on board. A male also died on the ground.
 Spantax Flight 995 a DC-10-30CF was destroyed by fire after an aborted takeoff at Málaga, 13 September 1982.
 Avianca Flight 011, registered HK-2910, a Boeing 747 flew too low and slammed onto terrain. It then bounced back and hit the terrain again before crashing in an inverted position, bursting into flames. 
 Madrid runway disaster, an Iberia Boeing 727-256 Adv.collided with an Aviaco McDonnell Douglas DC-9-32 at Madrid-Barajas Airport on 7 December 1983. 93 people were killed, including Mexican actress Fanny Cano and South African pianist Marc Raubenheimer.
 Iberia Airlines Flight 610, a Boeing 727-256 operated by Spain's national airline Iberia crashed into a television antenna, causing the wing to separate from the plane. It then banked heavily and crashed on the top of Mount Oiz in Biscay, near Bilbao on 19 February 1985. All 148 people on board were killed. The subsequent investigation concluded that pilot error was the cause of the crash.
 PauknAir Flight 4101, as the pilots could not see anything, they were not aware that Flight 4101 flew too low. It hit the ground killing all 38 people on board.
 Britannia Airways Flight 226A, crashed on landing at Girona-Costa Brava Airport, 14 September 1999.
 Spanair Flight 5022, Stalled, veered off the runway and crashed into a pond at Madrid Barajas International Airport, 20 August 2008, the crash killed 154 passengers and crew, leaving only 18 survivors. The investigation revealed that the pilots didn't set the flaps/slats before takeoff.
 Dan-Air Flight 1903, the de Havilland DH 106 Comet series 4 was approaching Barcelona Airport when it flew into the woods of Serralada del Montseny near Girona, killing everyone on board in the deadliest aircraft accident involving a De Havilland Comet series.
 Flightline Flight 101 crashes into the Mediterranean Sea near the Columbretes Islands after a lightning strike killing all 10 on board.

Sweden

1970 Spantax Convair crash, the aircraft crashed shortly after take-off from Stockholm Arlanda Airport, killing 5 people out of 10.
  Linjeflyg Flight 267, the aircraft was on approach but got off course from its track. It flew too low and crashed into the ground, killing 31 people. The airport had a military configuration rather than the normal civilian configuration. This caused a pilot error.
 Linjeflyg Flight 618,  during approach on Stockholm Bromma Airport, the aircraft dived into the ground and crashed in upside down condition, killing all 22 people on board. An ice build up had occurred on its tailfin, causing a disruption on its airflow and subsequently crashed the plane.
 SAS Flight 751, "The Gottröra accident", 27 December 1991.
 West Air Sweden Flight 294 crashed near Akkajaure.

Switzerland
 Swissair Flight 330 was a Convair Coronado that crashed near Würenlingen following detonation of a bomb on board, all 47 on board were killed.
 Ethiopian Airlines Flight 702 was carrying 202 passengers and crews when it was hijacked by the co-pilot over Sudan and landed in Geneva International Airport. The co-pilot was arrested.
 Alitalia Flight 404, a McDonnell Douglas DC-9 flew into a mountain near Weiach after its faulty navigational system caused the plane to not warn the pilots about the flight's dangerously low altitude. Everyone on board were killed.
 Swissair Flight 306, the Sud Aviation SE-210 Caravelle III was taking off from Zurich when a fire occurred on board. The prolonged fire damaged the aircraft's hydraulic system, thus, the aircraft lose control, and crashed into a village, destroying many ground structures. 
 Invicta International Airlines Flight 435 flew into the mountain, somersaulted and exploded in Switzerland's deadliest air disaster.
 Crossair Flight 3597 was on final approach to Zurich Airport when it crashed into a hill nearby. The aircraft slid and broke up, killing 24 people including several high-profile singers. Pilot error was blamed for the crash.
 Crossair Flight 498, shortly after takeoff, the aircraft dived, spiraled and crashed in nearly vertical condition, killing everyone on board.

Turkey

Air France Flight 152. a Lockheed L-749A Constellation, ditched into the Mediterranean Sea off Kızılada, Fethiye on August 3, 1953. Four people of 8 crew and 34 passengers drowned.
 Scandinavian Airlines System Flight 871, a Sud Aviation Caravelle crashed to high ground during its approach to land at Esenboğa International Airport, killing all 42 people on board. 
Turkish Airlines Flight 452, a Boeing 727-2F2, flew into the slope of a hill at Karatepe in Isparta on September 19, 1976, killing 154 people.
 Turkish Airlines Flight 158, a Boeing 737-4Q8, crashed during its final approach to land at Ankara Esenboğa Airport in driving snow 16 January 1983.
 Condor Flugdienst Flight 3782, a Boeing 737-230, crashed into Dümentepe Hill during its final approach to land at Adnan Menderes Airport on 2 January 1988. All 16 people on board were killed.
 Turkish Airlines Flight 278, a Boeing 737-4Y0, crashed during its final approach to land at Van Ferit Melen Airport in driving snow, 29 December 1994.
 Turkish Airlines Flight 5904, a Boeing 737-4Q8, crashed in Ceyhan 8 minutes after takeoff from Adana Şakirpaşa Airport, 7 April 1999.
 Turkish Airlines Flight 634, an Avro RJ100, crashed on its final approach during landing at Diyarbakır Airport, 8 January 2003.
 Atlasjet Flight 4203, a McDonnell Douglas MD-83, crashed on a hill during descent to Isparta Süleyman Demirel Airport, 30 November 2007.

Ukraine
 Aeroflot Flight 1491: While descending to Kharkov, the Antonov An-10's wings suddenly snapped and detached from the aircraft. The fuselage fell into the woods. All 122 people on board were killed.
 1979 Dniprodzerzhynsk mid-air collision: two Aeroflot Tupolev Tu-134s collided near Dniprodzerzhynsk on 11 August 1979, killing all 178 on both aircraft.
 Aeroflot Flight 528: The Yakovlev Yak-40 touched the runway too fast. The pilots then attempted to take-off again, but too late. It overran the runway, hit several obstacles and caught fire, killing 8 people.
 Aeroflot Flight 8381: An Aeroflot Tupolev Tu-134 was descending to Lviv Airport when it collided with a Soviet Air Force Antonov An-26. Both aircraft lost their right wings and tails, and crashed near the village of Zolochiv, killing 94 people.

 Malaysia Airlines Flight 17, a Boeing 777-200ER, was flying over Ukraine while en route to Kuala Lumpur International Airport when it was hit by a surface-to-air missile. As the missile exploded beside the aircraft, the shrapnel, thrown by the missile, penetrated the aircraft and destroyed the cockpit and the first class. The Boeing 777 spiraled and disintegrated in mid-air, sucking out passengers from their seats. It then crashed near Hrabove. All 298 people on board killed in the deadliest civilian airliner shootdown in history.

Pulkovo Aviation Enterprise Flight 612: On 22 August 2006, a Tupolev Tu-154M was flying over Donetsk Oblast in stormy conditions when it stalled and crashed near Sukha Balka, killing all 170 people on board. Ukraine's officials blamed pilot error for the crash. The crew flew the aircraft to an altitude higher than its design altitude.

United Kingdom

International waters 

Atlantic Ocean

 Air France Flight 447 – The Airbus A330 was carrying 228 people from Rio de Janeiro to Paris when its pitot tubes froze causing faulty airspeed reading. The plane then stalled. As the co-pilot took over, rather than getting out of the situation, he deepened the stall. The backup pilot sat next to him pushed the lever down and asked his co-pilot to do the same. However, a miscommunication occurred and his co-pilot pulled the lever even more, causing it to enter a deep stall. It then crashed into the Atlantic Ocean killing all on board.

 Air France Flight 1611 – crashed into the Mediterranean sea off Nice. All 89 passengers and 6 crew members on board were killed.

 Air India Flight 182 – was flying over the Atlantic Ocean off the west of Ireland when a bomb placed by a Sikh extremist exploded in the cargo hold. The Boeing 747 disintegrated and plunged into the Atlantic killing everyone aboard in Ireland's deadliest aviation disaster.
 American Airlines Flight 63 – Attempted bombing over Atlantic Ocean, terrorist was restrained and sedated.
 Birgenair Flight 301 – crashed in the Caribbean Sea, near the Dominican Republic; all 189 passengers and crew killed. Investigators found that a nest was found blocking its airspeed indicator, causing the pilot to misread it.
 BOAC Flight 777 was shot down by Luftwaffe fighter planes in the Bay of Biscay on 1 June 1943. All 17 aboard died, including actor Leslie Howard.
 Cubana Flight 455 – bombed, then crashed off west coast of Barbados.
 Dominicana DC-9 air disaster – crashed into the Caribbean Sea shortly after takeoff.

 EgyptAir Flight 990 – Crashed off the Atlantic coast of Nantucket. All 217 aboard were killed.
The most likely cause was catastrophic mechanical failure, though the cause is officially undetermined. All 99 aboard died.
 LAV Flight 253 – Crashed into the Atlantic off Asbury Park, New Jersey, on June 20, 1956. All 74 aboard died.
 Swissair Flight 111 – Crashed off the Atlantic coast of Nova Scotia.

 TWA Flight 800 – The Boeing 747 was climbing just after taking off when suddenly its fuel tank exploded. The front cabin of the plane detached from the plane and fell straight to the Atlantic. The middle and the back cabin remained intact, but burning. The 'decapitated' plane then climbed and later crashed off the Atlantic coast of East Moriches, New York. All on board were killed. Investigators found that a faulty cable ignited a fire in the fuel tank, causing it to explode violently.
 Vieques Air Link Flight 901A, crashed into the Atlantic Ocean, off Vieques, Puerto Rico, with 9 deaths.

Black Sea

 Siberia Airlines Flight 1812 – was flying near Ukraine on 4 October 2001, in a coincidence, a military practice was conducted by the Ukrainian army, which was to shoot a target by a missile. The target was ready and set. However, rather than locking to its actual target, the missile locked itself towards the Siberia Airlines plane. It then hit the plane. All 78 people aboard were killed. Ukraine paid ~$15 million compensation to victims' relatives.
Transair Georgian Airline Crash (21 September) – Shot down into the Black Sea by a missile upon landing.

Caribbean Sea
 FlyMontserrat Flight 107 –  Shortly after takeoff from V. C. Bird International Airport, the Britten-Norman Islander encountered an engine failure. The pilot apparently lost control of the plane. It then crashed into the sea, killing all 3 people on board.
 LIAT Flight 319 – Not long after taking off from Hewanorra International Airport in Saint Lucia,  the 19-seater DHC-6 crashed into the sea, killing all 13 people on board.
 ALM Flight 980 – After several unsuccessful landing attempts, the plane ran out of fuel. The crews were forced to ditch the plane, and 23 people drowned.

Indian Ocean 
 Lionair Flight 602 crashed into the ocean off the coast of Mannar District, Sri Lanka while carrying 55 on board. Everyone aboard were killed. The wreckage was discovered in 2012.
 Korean Air Flight 858 was destroyed by a bomb planted by North Korean agents on 29 November 1987. All 115 on board died.
 South African Airways Flight 295 crashed into the Indian Ocean in international waters off the coast of Mauritius on 28 November 1987 after a catastrophic in-flight fire. The cause of the fire was never determined. All 159 aboard were killed.

Pacific Ocean 

 Aeroperú Flight 603 – Off the coast of Peru
 Alaska Airlines Flight 261 – Off the coast of Oxnard, California.
 China Airlines Flight 006 – Plunged 30,000 feet while 350 miles northwest of San Francisco.
 Flying Tigers Line Flight 739 – mid-ocean.
 Korean Air Flight 007 – Shot down over the Sea of Okhotsk in Soviet airspace.
 Asiana Airlines Flight 991 – Near Jeju Island, South Korea
 Philippine Airlines Flight 434 – bomb exploded on board over Minami Daito Island in the Philippine Sea, near Okinawa, Japan.
China Airlines Flight 611- near Taiwan.

Oceania

Australia
 ANA Avro Ten crashed in the Snowy Mountains, New South Wales, 21 March 1931.
 ANA Stinson crashed near the border of Queensland and New South Wales, 19 February 1937.
 ANA DC-2 crashed into Mount Dandenong, Victoria, 25 October 1938.
 ANA Stinson Tokana crashed near Redesdale, Victoria, 31 January 1945.
 ANA DC-3 crashed at Seven-Mile Beach, Tasmania, 10 March 1946.
 ANA DC-3 crashed in New South Wales, 2 September 1948.
 Queensland Airlines Lockheed Lodestar crashed at Coolangatta, Queensland, 10 March 1949.
 MacRobertson Miller Aviation's DC-3 Fitzroy crashed immediately after takeoff from Perth on 2 July 1949.
 ANA DC-4 crashed after departure Perth, Western Australia, 26 June 1950.
 TAA Fokker Friendship crashed into the sea while preparing to land at Mackay, Queensland, 10 June 1960.
 Ansett-ANA Flight 325, a Vickers Viscount crashed into Botany Bay, New South Wales, 30 November 1961.
 Ansett-ANA Flight 149, a Vickers Viscount crashed while preparing to make an emergency landing at Winton, Queensland, 22 September 1966.
 MacRobertson Miller Airlines Flight 1750, a Vickers Viscount crashed near Port Hedland, Western Australia, on 31 December 1968.
 Beech Super King Air crashed after take-off from Sydney Airport on 21 February 1980.
 Beechcraft Baron Registered VH-TLO crashed on approach to airstrip, Mt Diane, Palmer River Far North Qld, on February 2, 1987, with 5 killed and 3 survivors. 
 Beech Super King Air departed Perth and crashed in Queensland in September 2000, killing all eight on board.
 Lockhart River air disaster occurred on 7 May 2005, involving the death of all 15 occupants of a Fairchild Metroliner.
B200 Super King Air Crash occurred on February 21, 2017, when shortly after takeoff the plane stalled into the DFO Shopping complex near Essendon Airport, Victoria, killing the pilot and all 4 Passengers.

Fiji
 24 July 1999 - *Air Fiji Flight 121, crashed into the mountainside due to pilot error, killing everyone on board.

French Polynesia
 22 July 1973 - Pan Am Flight 816 crashes into the sea for undetermined reasons, killing 78 people on board.
 9 August 2007 - Air Moorea Flight 1121 crashes into the sea due to an elevator cable failure killing all 20 on board.

Guam (United States) 
 6 August 1997 - Korean Air Flight 801 crashes on approach to Antonio B. Won Pat International Airport, Guam. 228 of the 254 people aboard the Boeing 747 perished in the crash.

New Zealand

 New Zealand National Airways Corporation Flight 441 crashed in the Kaimai Ranges on 3 July 1963, killing all 23 people were on board.
 Air New Zealand Flight 4374 crashed on approach to Auckland Airport from Gisborne Airport on 17 February 1979, killing 2 out of the 4 people on board.
 Ansett New Zealand Flight 703 crashed during approach to Palmerston North, on 5 June 1995, killing 4 of 21 people on board.
 Eagle Airways Flight 2279 was hijacked on 8 February 2008 on a flight from Blenheim to Christchurch.

Papua New Guinea
 Airlines PNG Flight 4684 – On 11 August 2009, a de Havilland Twin Otter was on approach to Kokoda Airport while carrying 13 passengers and crews. However, the plane crashed into the eastern slope of the Kokoda Gap on bad weather. Due to the massive impact forces, the plane was pulverised. All on board killed.
 Airlines PNG Flight 1600 – On 13 October 2011, a de Havilland Canada Dash 8 was en route to Madang Airport while carrying 32 people when one of its propellers oversped. This causing a catastrophic engine failure. The pilots decided to land the plane near Guabe River. While the plane was landing, the plane gradually, disintegrated. Eventually, the plane exploded. The cockpit flung from the main body. Only 4 people survived.
 2016 Sunbird Aviation crash – On 13 April 2016, a Britten-Norman BN-2T aircraft crashed into a forest, just 1 km short of the runway in Kiunga. All 12 people on board perished.

North America

Canada
 9 December 1956 - Trans-Canada Air Lines Flight 810 crashed into Mount Slesse near Chilliwack, British Columbia on 9 December 1956 after encountering severe icing and turbulence, resulting in the death of all 62 people on board.
 29 November 1963 - Trans-Canada Air Lines Flight 831, a Douglas DC-8-54CF Jet Trader operated by Trans-Canada Air Lines crashed into a soggy field, killing all 118 on board. 
 8 July 1965 - Canadian Pacific Airlines Flight 21 crashed near 100 Mile House, British Columbia, after an in-flight explosion. All 52 aboard were killed.
 5 July 1970 - Air Canada Flight 621 crashed due to pilot error while attempting to land at Toronto. All 109 people on board were killed.
 11 February 1978 - Pacific Western Airlines Flight 314 crashed after thrust reversers did not fully stow following a rejected landing that was executed in order to avoid a snowplow. The crash killed four of the crew members and 38 of the 44 passengers.
 26 June 1978 - Air Canada Flight 189 crashed on takeoff in Toronto due to pilot error and mechanical failure. Two passengers were killed.
 29 March 1979 - Quebecair Flight 255, a Fairchild F-27 operated by Quebecair crashes into a hill due to engine separation, killing 17.
. 
 23 July 1983 - Air Canada Flight 143, commonly known as the Gimli Glider. The Boeing 767 ran out of fuel over the Canadian Shield due to a maintenance error, and had to glide to a landing at a former airbase at Gimli, Manitoba.
 22 March 1984 - Pacific Western Airlines Flight 501 burst into flames upon takeoff from Calgary International Airport due to mechanical failure. No one was killed.
 12 December 1985 - Arrow Air Flight 1285 crashed shortly after takeoff due to icing. All 256 aboard died.
 10 March 1989 - Air Ontario Flight 1363 crashed soon after takeoff due to icing. Of 65 people on board, 24 were killed.

 16 December 1997 - Air Canada Flight 646 skidded off the runway and crashed into a tree while attempting to land at Fredericton International Airport in Fredericton, New Brunswick. 35 of the 42 passengers and crew were injured.

 18 June 1998 - Propair Flight 420, a Fairchild Metroliner SA226 operated by Propair from Montreal-Dorval Airport to Peterborough, Ontario suffered an in-flight fire causing the wing to fall off during an emergency landing at Mirabel Airport, killing all 11 on board.
 2 September 1998 - Swissair Flight 111 crashed into the Atlantic Ocean southwest of the Halifax International Airport at the entrance to St. Margarets Bay, Nova Scotia on Wednesday, following an in-flight fire which lead to electrical failure, spatial disorientation and crew distraction. All 229 people on board died.
 14 October 2004 - MK Airlines Flight 1602 runs off the runway on take-off from Halifax Stanfield International Airport and crashes killing all 7 crew. The cause of the crash is attributed to incorrect take-off speed calculations.
 2 August 2005 - Air France Flight 358 burst into flames after overshooting the runway at Toronto Pearson International Airport. There were no casualties.
 20 August 2011 - First Air Flight 6560 suffered a controlled flight into terrain in poor weather while attempting to land at Resolute, Nunavut. Of the 15 people on board, 12 were killed, and three were injured but survived.
 29 March 2015 - Air Canada Flight 624 hit an electric power line then made a hard landing as it skidded off a runway at Halifax Stanfield International Airport, Nova Scotia during a snowstorm. All 133 passengers and crew survived, but 23 suffered injuries.

United States

Mexico
 Aeroméxico Flight 229 crashed into the side of a mountain while on approach to Lic. Gustavo Díaz Ordaz International Airport on 20 June 1973, killing all 27 people on board.
 Aeromexico Flight 230 touched down too hard during landing, bounced back and broke up. It then caught fire and killing 32 people on board. 34 people survived the crash. 
 Aerocaribe Flight 7831 crashed into mountain and burst into flames, killing all 19 people on board instantly.
 Mexicana Flight 704 made a continuous descent in the last five minutes before impact, then turned left instead of right and collided with Cerro del Fraile, killing all 79 people on board.
Mexicana Flight 940 suffered in-flight fire due to maintenance error, leading to loss of hydraulics and electrical systems that caused the aircraft to crash in El Carbón, killing all 167 people on board.
July 30, 1987 - A Belize Air International Boeing C-97G Stratofreighter crashes onto a road due to a cargo shift killing 49.
 TAESA Flight 725 stalled and crashed in Uruapan after a slat malfunction, killing all 18 people on board.
 Western Airlines Flight 2605 landed on the wrong runway, hit a maintenance vehicle, bounced back, struck a hangar, crashed and broke apart, killing 73 people, including one person on the ground.
 November 4, 2008 Mexico City Learjet crash crashed in central Mexico City at around 18:45 local time on. The nine people on board, including the Mexican Secretary of the Interior Juan Camilo Mouriño, were killed in the crash, along with seven people on the ground. 
 September 9, 2009 - Aeroméxico Flight 576, a Boeing 737-852 operated by Aeroméxico is hijacked. Everyone survives. 
 April 13, 2010 - AeroUnion Flight 302, an Airbus A300B4-203F operated by AeroUnion stalls and crashes on approach killing 7.
 November 26, 2015 - Magnicharters Flight 779, a Boeing 737-322 operated by Magnicharters suffers a landing gear collapse. Everyone survives. 
 October 24, 2016 - A FlyMex Dornier 328JET-310 veers off the runway. Everyone survives. 
 July 31, 2018 - Aeroméxico Connect Flight 2431, an Embraer 190AR operated by Aeroméxico Connect crashes on takeoff due to low altitude windshear. Everyone survives. 
 December 24, 2019 - Calafia Airlines Flight 7872, a Cessna 208B Grand Caravan operated by Calafia Airlines crashes into a hill killing 2.

South America



Argentina
 Aerolíneas Argentinas Flight 644 – Half an hour after take-off, the plane entered severe turbulence. The plane then crashed near Pardo, Buenos Aires, killing everyone on board.
 Aerolíneas Argentinas Flight 707 – The aircraft, named "Ciudad de Bahía Blanca", entered severe turbulence while en route on its third leg between Camba Puntá Airport and Islas Malvinas International Airport. The pilots lost control of the aircraft and crashed into terrain, killing everyone on board.
 Austral Líneas Aéreas Flight 46 – The McDonnell Douglas MD-81 clipped a eucalyptus tree and crashed 3 km short of the runway while on approach to Libertador General Jose de San Martin Airport on June 12, 1988, killing all 22 people on board.
 Austral Líneas Aéreas Flight 901 – Flight 901 was cleared to land at Aeroparque Jorge Newbery in Buenos Aires when it suddenly lose control and crashed into the river, all aboard were killed. The investigation blamed the pilots for underestimating the intensity of the storm.
 LAPA Flight 3142 – Crashed at Aeroparque Jorge Newbery, Buenos Aires.
 Sol Líneas Aéreas Flight 5428 – Crashed at Prahuaniyeu, Río Negro.

Bolivia
 Eastern Air Lines Flight 980 – A Boeing 727 crashed into Mount Illimani on 1 January 1985, killing all 29 people on board.

Brazil
 1960 Rio de Janeiro mid-air collision – A United States Navy Douglas DC-6 collided in the air over Guanabara Bay with a Real Transportes Aéreos Douglas DC-3 on February 25, 1960. Only 3 people survived, all of whom were from the United States Navy's aircraft.
 Aerolíneas Argentinas Flight 322 – The plane clipped several tree tops and crashed into terrain during climbout, killing all 52 people on board.
 Lufthansa Flight 502 –   The Lockheed L-1049G Super Constellation was on approach to Rio de Janeiro. However, the plane descended too low. Its nose wheel struck the water. The pilots continued the approach but later on they lose control of the plane. It then crashed near Flecheiras Beach. Only 3 crew members survived the crash.
 VASP Flight 168 – Crashed into the Aratanha mountains in Ceará, northeast Brazil.
 Varig Flight 254 – Crashed into a jungle near Sao Jose do Xingu into the Cachimbo mountains, central-west Brazil.
 Transbrasil Flight 303 – Crashed into a hill during instrumental approach to Florianópolis, Brazil.

 TAM Transportes Aéreos Regionais Flight 402 – Crashed near the airport of Congonhas in São Paulo, southeast Brazil, during the takeoff.

 Gol Transportes Aereos Flight 1907 – Flight 1907 was flying over Amazon when one of its wings suddenly cut off from the Boeing 737. This caused the plane to roll uncontrollably, corkscrew, and break up due to the stress this put on the airframe. It then crashed into a jungle near Sao Jose do Xingu in the Cachimbo mountains. All 154 people on board were killed. A U.S. Embraer Legacy aircraft accidentally turned its transponder off, causing the Gol Flight and ATC to not notice the Embraer plane. The Embraer winglets then sliced the Gol's wing. Everyone on board the Embraer survived.
 TAM Airlines Flight 3054 – Crashed near the airport of Congonhas in São Paulo, southeast Brazil, during the landing, killing all 187 on board and 12 on the ground, making it the worst plane crash in Brazil and South America.
 1982 TABA Fairchild FH-227 accident – crashed on approach to land at Tabatinga International Airport
 1984 TAM – Transportes Aéreos Regionais Bandeirante accident – an Embraer EMB-110 Bandeirante crashed into terrain. Everyone on board was killed.
 VASP Flight 210 - Slammed into a dyke after an accidental take-off attempt from a taxiway and a subsequent overrun of the taxiway. 1 passenger is killed.

Chile
 Aeronor Flight 304 the aircraft suffered a malfunction in one of its motors and crashed into a stone wall near La Florida Airport, La Serena, killing all 46 people on board.
 LAN Chile Flight 160 crashed into a farm near Colina. However, all 60 people on board survived the crash.
 LAN Chile Flight 210, the aircraft smashed into the side of the Andes mountain while carrying 24 people including 8 professional footballers and 2 coaching staff from CD Green Cross. All aboard were killed.
 LAN Chile Flight 107 the Douglas DC-6 crashed into the side of La Corona Mountain in the Andes, killing everyone on board. 
 British South American Airways Avro Lancastrian Star Dust G-AGWH crashed in the Andes (the "STENDEC" incident).

Colombia
 Aeropesca Colombia Flight 221, the Vickers Viscount 745D, named Ciudad de Popayana, crashed and exploded after impacting Mount Santa Elana on 26 August 1981, killing all 50 people on board.
 Aeropesca Colombia Flight 217, the Vickers Viscount carrying 21 people crashed into a mountain on 26 March 1982. All aboard were killed.
 Air France Flight 422 – a Boeing 727 leased from TAME Airlines, it crashes into the mountains east of Bogotá, Colombia shortly after takeoff, killing all 53 people on board.
 American Airlines Flight 965 – Crashed into a mountain in Colombia, killing 159 and leaving 4 survivors. The investigation determined that pilot error was the main cause of the crash.
 Avianca Flight 4 – A Douglas C-54 was taking off from Bogota when it suddenly stalled, causing a rapid descent. The aircraft crashed into the sea, leaving 8 survivors.
 Avianca Flight 203 – Exploded by bomb as part of an assassination attempt while flying over Soacha.
 Avianca Flight 410 – Crashed in Santander, Colombia.
 AIRES Flight 8250 – Upon landing on San Andrés Gustavo Rojas Pinilla International Airport, the Boeing 737 crashed and broke up into several parts. 2 people were killed, while 119 others were injured. Pilots action saved the aircraft from post-impact fire and collision with the airport.
 Intercontinental de Aviación Flight 256 – The Douglas DC-9 impacted with the ground in a marshy lagoon near María La Baja, 56 km from Cartagena Airport due to a false altimeter setting. 51 people were killed. The only survivor was a 9-year-old girl who apparently fell out before the aircraft caught fire.

 LaMia Flight 2933 – A charter flight by an Avro RJ85, operated by LaMia, crashed near the José María Córdova International Airport in Colombia. It was transporting the Brazilian Chapecoense football squad from Viru Viru International Airport in Santa Cruz de la Sierra, Bolivia, to José María Córdova International Airport in Colombia. 71 people, including 19 players of the Chapecoense football team, were killed in the crash.
 SAM Colombia Flight 501 – A Boeing 727 operated by SAM Colombia hit Mt. Paramo de Frontino at 12,300 ft. while on approach to José María Córdova International Airport, killing all 132 people on board. The VHF omnidirectional range/distance measuring equipment had been sabotaged by terrorists and was not in service.
 TAME Flight 120 – The Boeing 727-134 was on approach to Teniente Coronel Luis a Mantilla International Airport in foggy conditions on January 28, 2002, when it crashed into the side of Cumbal Volcano, killing all 94 people on board instantly. Colombian authorities concluded that pilot error was the cause of the accident.

Ecuador
 1982 Aerocondor DHC-4 Caribou accident – flew into high ground
 TAME Boeing 737 crash – The Boeing 737, named Ciudad de Loja, was on approach to Cuenca when the pilots went distracted. They were not aware that the plane was flying dangerously low and flew into terrain. At the same time, it was suspected that both pilots were experimenting with their aircraft, indicating a possible lack of experience. It then crashed into a hill, killing all 119 people on board.

Guyana
 Caribbean Airlines Flight 523 – Upon landing on Cheddi Jagan International Airport, the Boeing 737 overran the runway, went through the perimeter fence, crashed and broke into two sections. Incredibly, no one was killed. However, 7 people were injured.

Peru
Faucett Flight 251, a Boeing 737-200 passenger plane which crashed on approach to Rodríguez Ballón International Airport in Arequipa, killing all 123 people on board.
LANSA Flight 508 Pilot error led to a lightning strike, fire and structural failure. The aircraft broke up over the Amazon rainforest in December 1971.
 LANSA Flight 501, the Lockheed L-749A Constellation crashed into the side of Mount Talalua, killing all on board.
 Aerolíneas Argentinas Flight 386 Passengers suffered from foodborne illness resulting in one fatality.
 TANS Perú Flight 222 Crashed on approach, January 2003.
 TANS Peru Flight 204, a Boeing 737-200 passenger plane which crashed during a storm in the Peruvian jungle, killing at least 40 people of the approximately 100 on board.
 LATAM Perú Flight 2213, an Airbus A320neo collided with a fire truck. All passengers were unharmed but two firefighters were killed and one injured.

Suriname
 Surinam Airways Flight 764 – The McDonnell Douglas DC-8-62 clipped a tree and flipped over while on approach to Zanderij airport, Suriname, killing 176 people, including a group of Surinamese football players called Colourful 11.

Uruguay
 Austral Líneas Aéreas Flight 2553 – The plane was on cruising when the stall aural warning suddenly sounded. Its pitot tubes froze and caused a misreading. However, the pilots were not aware of this and put the aircraft on nose down to increase their speed. The plane was never at stall speed and was actually nearly overspeeding. The stall warning still sounded and flight crews retracted the plane's slat. As because the plane was overspeeding, one of its slats came off, and the plane lost control. The plane crashed at Nuevo Berlín, Uruguay at a nearly perpendicular angle, killing all aboard.

Venezuela
 Viasa Flight 742, a McDonnell Douglas DC-9-32 that crashed near Maracaibo Airport on March 16, 1969, killing 84 people on the aircraft and 71 on the ground. 
 Linea Aeropostal Venezolana Flight 253 (November 1956) was flying through a rainstorm as it approached Caracas Airport when it crashed into a mountain near Caracas Venezuela, killing all 25 people on board.
 West Caribbean Airways Flight 708 was flying over Venezuela while carrying French tourist when it stalled. The pilots misidentified it as an engine failure and pulled down the stick, thus, deepening the stall. The plane then crashed into a field in Machiques killing all 160 people on board.
 11 March 1983 Avensa Douglas DC-9 crash, 23 killed.
  5 March 1991 – Aeropostal Alas de Venezuela Flight 108, a McDonnell Douglas DC-9 crashes into a mountain (Paramo Los Torres) shortly after taking off from La Chinita International Airport, Venezuela. All 45 passengers and crew are killed.
 Cubana de Aviación Flight 310: Russian-built Yak-42 crashed near Valencia, Venezuela, and killed 22. The crash took the number of Cubana disasters from 1970 to 2000 to eight; one of them (see above) was the result of sabotage.
 1 February 2008 – Santa Bárbara Airlines Flight 518, an ATR 42-300, crashes shortly after taking off from Mérida, Venezuela, killing all 46 on board.

See also
 List of aircraft accidents and incidents resulting in at least 50 fatalities
 List of accidents and incidents involving airliners by airline
 List of accidents and incidents involving commercial aircraft

References

External links
 Aircraft Crashes Record Office
 AirSafe
 Aviation Safety Network
 BBC News
 CNN International
 Federal Aviation Administration

 
Airliners by location
Accidents and incidents
Articles containing video clips